

560001–560100 

|-bgcolor=#d6d6d6
| 560001 ||  || — || November 2, 2013 || Mount Lemmon || Mount Lemmon Survey ||  || align=right | 2.7 km || 
|-id=002 bgcolor=#d6d6d6
| 560002 ||  || — || December 29, 2008 || Mount Lemmon || Mount Lemmon Survey ||  || align=right | 2.8 km || 
|-id=003 bgcolor=#d6d6d6
| 560003 ||  || — || November 28, 2013 || Kitt Peak || Spacewatch ||  || align=right | 2.3 km || 
|-id=004 bgcolor=#d6d6d6
| 560004 ||  || — || February 18, 2015 || Haleakala || Pan-STARRS ||  || align=right | 2.6 km || 
|-id=005 bgcolor=#d6d6d6
| 560005 ||  || — || February 17, 2015 || Haleakala || Pan-STARRS ||  || align=right | 2.7 km || 
|-id=006 bgcolor=#d6d6d6
| 560006 ||  || — || February 17, 2015 || Haleakala || Pan-STARRS ||  || align=right | 2.8 km || 
|-id=007 bgcolor=#d6d6d6
| 560007 ||  || — || August 13, 2006 || Palomar || NEAT ||  || align=right | 3.1 km || 
|-id=008 bgcolor=#d6d6d6
| 560008 ||  || — || December 11, 2013 || Mount Lemmon || Mount Lemmon Survey ||  || align=right | 3.3 km || 
|-id=009 bgcolor=#d6d6d6
| 560009 ||  || — || February 18, 2015 || Kitt Peak || L. H. Wasserman, M. W. Buie ||  || align=right | 2.5 km || 
|-id=010 bgcolor=#d6d6d6
| 560010 ||  || — || March 16, 2015 || Haleakala || Pan-STARRS ||  || align=right | 2.8 km || 
|-id=011 bgcolor=#d6d6d6
| 560011 ||  || — || April 10, 2010 || Kitt Peak || Spacewatch ||  || align=right | 3.0 km || 
|-id=012 bgcolor=#d6d6d6
| 560012 ||  || — || December 31, 2013 || Kitt Peak || Spacewatch ||  || align=right | 2.4 km || 
|-id=013 bgcolor=#d6d6d6
| 560013 ||  || — || September 16, 2006 || Siding Spring || SSS ||  || align=right | 3.1 km || 
|-id=014 bgcolor=#d6d6d6
| 560014 ||  || — || February 18, 2015 || Haleakala || Pan-STARRS || Tj (2.99) || align=right | 2.3 km || 
|-id=015 bgcolor=#d6d6d6
| 560015 ||  || — || March 30, 2004 || Kitt Peak || Spacewatch ||  || align=right | 2.9 km || 
|-id=016 bgcolor=#d6d6d6
| 560016 ||  || — || January 30, 2009 || Mount Lemmon || Mount Lemmon Survey ||  || align=right | 2.6 km || 
|-id=017 bgcolor=#d6d6d6
| 560017 ||  || — || March 16, 2015 || Haleakala || Pan-STARRS ||  || align=right | 2.4 km || 
|-id=018 bgcolor=#d6d6d6
| 560018 ||  || — || March 16, 2015 || Haleakala || Pan-STARRS ||  || align=right | 2.6 km || 
|-id=019 bgcolor=#d6d6d6
| 560019 ||  || — || November 19, 2007 || Mount Lemmon || Mount Lemmon Survey ||  || align=right | 3.1 km || 
|-id=020 bgcolor=#d6d6d6
| 560020 ||  || — || October 18, 2011 || Haleakala || Pan-STARRS ||  || align=right | 2.6 km || 
|-id=021 bgcolor=#E9E9E9
| 560021 ||  || — || May 29, 2011 || Mount Lemmon || Mount Lemmon Survey ||  || align=right | 1.5 km || 
|-id=022 bgcolor=#d6d6d6
| 560022 ||  || — || March 16, 2015 || Haleakala || Pan-STARRS ||  || align=right | 3.2 km || 
|-id=023 bgcolor=#d6d6d6
| 560023 ||  || — || December 31, 2013 || Mount Lemmon || Mount Lemmon Survey ||  || align=right | 2.6 km || 
|-id=024 bgcolor=#d6d6d6
| 560024 ||  || — || November 18, 2007 || Mount Lemmon || Mount Lemmon Survey ||  || align=right | 2.3 km || 
|-id=025 bgcolor=#d6d6d6
| 560025 ||  || — || February 4, 2009 || Mount Lemmon || Mount Lemmon Survey ||  || align=right | 2.0 km || 
|-id=026 bgcolor=#d6d6d6
| 560026 ||  || — || February 22, 2009 || Kitt Peak || Spacewatch ||  || align=right | 2.3 km || 
|-id=027 bgcolor=#d6d6d6
| 560027 ||  || — || May 5, 2010 || Mount Lemmon || Mount Lemmon Survey ||  || align=right | 3.3 km || 
|-id=028 bgcolor=#d6d6d6
| 560028 ||  || — || February 16, 2010 || Mount Lemmon || Mount Lemmon Survey ||  || align=right | 3.2 km || 
|-id=029 bgcolor=#d6d6d6
| 560029 ||  || — || October 25, 2013 || Kitt Peak || Spacewatch ||  || align=right | 2.6 km || 
|-id=030 bgcolor=#d6d6d6
| 560030 ||  || — || October 23, 2013 || Haleakala || Pan-STARRS ||  || align=right | 2.2 km || 
|-id=031 bgcolor=#d6d6d6
| 560031 ||  || — || January 17, 2015 || Haleakala || Pan-STARRS ||  || align=right | 3.3 km || 
|-id=032 bgcolor=#d6d6d6
| 560032 ||  || — || October 24, 2007 || Mount Lemmon || Mount Lemmon Survey ||  || align=right | 4.1 km || 
|-id=033 bgcolor=#d6d6d6
| 560033 ||  || — || October 31, 2013 || Catalina || CSS ||  || align=right | 3.4 km || 
|-id=034 bgcolor=#d6d6d6
| 560034 ||  || — || April 15, 2010 || Kitt Peak || Spacewatch ||  || align=right | 3.8 km || 
|-id=035 bgcolor=#d6d6d6
| 560035 ||  || — || April 18, 2005 || Kitt Peak || Spacewatch ||  || align=right | 3.7 km || 
|-id=036 bgcolor=#d6d6d6
| 560036 ||  || — || December 30, 2008 || Mount Lemmon || Mount Lemmon Survey ||  || align=right | 3.4 km || 
|-id=037 bgcolor=#d6d6d6
| 560037 ||  || — || November 26, 2013 || Haleakala || Pan-STARRS ||  || align=right | 2.2 km || 
|-id=038 bgcolor=#d6d6d6
| 560038 ||  || — || August 17, 2012 || Siding Spring || SSS ||  || align=right | 3.3 km || 
|-id=039 bgcolor=#C2E0FF
| 560039 ||  || — || March 18, 2015 || Haleakala || Pan-STARRS || plutinocritical || align=right | 145 km || 
|-id=040 bgcolor=#d6d6d6
| 560040 ||  || — || September 26, 2011 || Haleakala || Pan-STARRS ||  || align=right | 2.7 km || 
|-id=041 bgcolor=#d6d6d6
| 560041 ||  || — || October 23, 2006 || Mount Lemmon || Mount Lemmon Survey ||  || align=right | 3.0 km || 
|-id=042 bgcolor=#d6d6d6
| 560042 ||  || — || March 17, 2015 || Haleakala || Pan-STARRS ||  || align=right | 2.8 km || 
|-id=043 bgcolor=#fefefe
| 560043 ||  || — || September 25, 2012 || Mount Lemmon || Mount Lemmon Survey ||  || align=right data-sort-value="0.65" | 650 m || 
|-id=044 bgcolor=#d6d6d6
| 560044 ||  || — || April 18, 2009 || Kitt Peak || Spacewatch ||  || align=right | 2.6 km || 
|-id=045 bgcolor=#d6d6d6
| 560045 ||  || — || March 31, 2009 || Catalina || CSS ||  || align=right | 3.2 km || 
|-id=046 bgcolor=#d6d6d6
| 560046 ||  || — || September 18, 2006 || Kitt Peak || Spacewatch ||  || align=right | 2.5 km || 
|-id=047 bgcolor=#d6d6d6
| 560047 ||  || — || September 14, 2013 || Haleakala || Pan-STARRS ||  || align=right | 2.8 km || 
|-id=048 bgcolor=#E9E9E9
| 560048 ||  || — || October 23, 2009 || Mount Lemmon || Mount Lemmon Survey ||  || align=right | 1.4 km || 
|-id=049 bgcolor=#d6d6d6
| 560049 ||  || — || September 24, 2007 || Kitt Peak || Spacewatch ||  || align=right | 2.6 km || 
|-id=050 bgcolor=#d6d6d6
| 560050 ||  || — || January 18, 2015 || Haleakala || Pan-STARRS ||  || align=right | 3.6 km || 
|-id=051 bgcolor=#d6d6d6
| 560051 ||  || — || October 10, 2007 || Catalina || CSS ||  || align=right | 3.3 km || 
|-id=052 bgcolor=#d6d6d6
| 560052 ||  || — || October 8, 2007 || Mount Lemmon || Mount Lemmon Survey ||  || align=right | 2.1 km || 
|-id=053 bgcolor=#d6d6d6
| 560053 ||  || — || October 28, 2013 || Mount Lemmon || Mount Lemmon Survey ||  || align=right | 2.5 km || 
|-id=054 bgcolor=#d6d6d6
| 560054 ||  || — || January 22, 2015 || Haleakala || Pan-STARRS ||  || align=right | 2.3 km || 
|-id=055 bgcolor=#d6d6d6
| 560055 ||  || — || January 16, 2015 || Haleakala || Pan-STARRS ||  || align=right | 2.3 km || 
|-id=056 bgcolor=#d6d6d6
| 560056 ||  || — || August 20, 2000 || Kitt Peak || Spacewatch ||  || align=right | 3.0 km || 
|-id=057 bgcolor=#d6d6d6
| 560057 ||  || — || August 26, 2012 || Haleakala || Pan-STARRS ||  || align=right | 2.5 km || 
|-id=058 bgcolor=#E9E9E9
| 560058 ||  || — || July 29, 2008 || Kitt Peak || Spacewatch ||  || align=right | 1.3 km || 
|-id=059 bgcolor=#E9E9E9
| 560059 ||  || — || January 22, 2015 || Haleakala || Pan-STARRS ||  || align=right | 1.1 km || 
|-id=060 bgcolor=#d6d6d6
| 560060 ||  || — || November 11, 2013 || Kitt Peak || Spacewatch ||  || align=right | 2.2 km || 
|-id=061 bgcolor=#d6d6d6
| 560061 ||  || — || February 16, 2010 || Kitt Peak || Spacewatch ||  || align=right | 2.6 km || 
|-id=062 bgcolor=#d6d6d6
| 560062 ||  || — || November 9, 2008 || Mount Lemmon || Mount Lemmon Survey ||  || align=right | 2.1 km || 
|-id=063 bgcolor=#d6d6d6
| 560063 ||  || — || October 9, 2008 || Kitt Peak || Spacewatch ||  || align=right | 2.2 km || 
|-id=064 bgcolor=#E9E9E9
| 560064 ||  || — || April 30, 2011 || Mount Lemmon || Mount Lemmon Survey ||  || align=right | 2.3 km || 
|-id=065 bgcolor=#d6d6d6
| 560065 ||  || — || September 14, 2013 || Mount Lemmon || Mount Lemmon Survey ||  || align=right | 3.1 km || 
|-id=066 bgcolor=#d6d6d6
| 560066 ||  || — || October 3, 2013 || Mount Lemmon || Mount Lemmon Survey ||  || align=right | 2.5 km || 
|-id=067 bgcolor=#d6d6d6
| 560067 ||  || — || September 26, 2013 || Mount Lemmon || Mount Lemmon Survey ||  || align=right | 2.0 km || 
|-id=068 bgcolor=#fefefe
| 560068 ||  || — || March 18, 2015 || Haleakala || Pan-STARRS || H || align=right data-sort-value="0.62" | 620 m || 
|-id=069 bgcolor=#d6d6d6
| 560069 ||  || — || November 28, 2013 || Mount Lemmon || Mount Lemmon Survey ||  || align=right | 2.8 km || 
|-id=070 bgcolor=#d6d6d6
| 560070 ||  || — || February 22, 2015 || Haleakala || Pan-STARRS ||  || align=right | 2.5 km || 
|-id=071 bgcolor=#E9E9E9
| 560071 ||  || — || November 28, 2013 || Mount Lemmon || Mount Lemmon Survey ||  || align=right | 2.4 km || 
|-id=072 bgcolor=#d6d6d6
| 560072 ||  || — || December 30, 2008 || Mount Lemmon || Mount Lemmon Survey ||  || align=right | 2.7 km || 
|-id=073 bgcolor=#E9E9E9
| 560073 ||  || — || January 20, 2015 || Haleakala || Pan-STARRS ||  || align=right | 1.6 km || 
|-id=074 bgcolor=#d6d6d6
| 560074 ||  || — || October 5, 2013 || Haleakala || Pan-STARRS ||  || align=right | 2.2 km || 
|-id=075 bgcolor=#d6d6d6
| 560075 ||  || — || August 12, 2012 || Kitt Peak || Spacewatch ||  || align=right | 2.7 km || 
|-id=076 bgcolor=#d6d6d6
| 560076 ||  || — || October 9, 2012 || Haleakala || Pan-STARRS ||  || align=right | 2.3 km || 
|-id=077 bgcolor=#d6d6d6
| 560077 ||  || — || November 29, 2013 || Mount Lemmon || Mount Lemmon Survey ||  || align=right | 2.2 km || 
|-id=078 bgcolor=#d6d6d6
| 560078 ||  || — || October 10, 1996 || Kitt Peak || Spacewatch || Tj (2.99) || align=right | 2.6 km || 
|-id=079 bgcolor=#d6d6d6
| 560079 ||  || — || November 5, 2007 || Mount Lemmon || Mount Lemmon Survey ||  || align=right | 4.1 km || 
|-id=080 bgcolor=#d6d6d6
| 560080 ||  || — || December 19, 2007 || Kitt Peak || Spacewatch ||  || align=right | 3.7 km || 
|-id=081 bgcolor=#d6d6d6
| 560081 ||  || — || January 28, 2015 || Haleakala || Pan-STARRS ||  || align=right | 2.3 km || 
|-id=082 bgcolor=#d6d6d6
| 560082 ||  || — || November 27, 2013 || Haleakala || Pan-STARRS ||  || align=right | 2.8 km || 
|-id=083 bgcolor=#d6d6d6
| 560083 ||  || — || July 21, 2006 || Mount Lemmon || Mount Lemmon Survey || Tj (2.92) || align=right | 3.2 km || 
|-id=084 bgcolor=#d6d6d6
| 560084 ||  || — || March 24, 2003 || Apache Point || SDSS Collaboration ||  || align=right | 3.9 km || 
|-id=085 bgcolor=#d6d6d6
| 560085 ||  || — || February 16, 2015 || Haleakala || Pan-STARRS ||  || align=right | 3.2 km || 
|-id=086 bgcolor=#d6d6d6
| 560086 ||  || — || March 18, 2015 || Haleakala || Pan-STARRS ||  || align=right | 2.5 km || 
|-id=087 bgcolor=#d6d6d6
| 560087 ||  || — || March 18, 2015 || Haleakala || Pan-STARRS ||  || align=right | 2.7 km || 
|-id=088 bgcolor=#d6d6d6
| 560088 ||  || — || April 20, 2010 || Kitt Peak || Spacewatch ||  || align=right | 2.2 km || 
|-id=089 bgcolor=#d6d6d6
| 560089 ||  || — || March 17, 2015 || Haleakala || Pan-STARRS ||  || align=right | 2.6 km || 
|-id=090 bgcolor=#d6d6d6
| 560090 ||  || — || March 17, 2015 || Haleakala || Pan-STARRS ||  || align=right | 2.4 km || 
|-id=091 bgcolor=#d6d6d6
| 560091 ||  || — || March 19, 2009 || Mount Lemmon || Mount Lemmon Survey ||  || align=right | 2.3 km || 
|-id=092 bgcolor=#d6d6d6
| 560092 ||  || — || March 27, 2009 || Mount Lemmon || Mount Lemmon Survey || Tj (2.94) || align=right | 3.0 km || 
|-id=093 bgcolor=#d6d6d6
| 560093 ||  || — || August 4, 2005 || Kitt Peak || NEAT ||  || align=right | 3.4 km || 
|-id=094 bgcolor=#fefefe
| 560094 ||  || — || November 1, 2010 || Kitt Peak || Spacewatch ||  || align=right data-sort-value="0.63" | 630 m || 
|-id=095 bgcolor=#d6d6d6
| 560095 ||  || — || September 2, 2011 || Haleakala || Pan-STARRS ||  || align=right | 2.8 km || 
|-id=096 bgcolor=#d6d6d6
| 560096 ||  || — || March 18, 2015 || Haleakala || Pan-STARRS ||  || align=right | 2.3 km || 
|-id=097 bgcolor=#d6d6d6
| 560097 ||  || — || December 25, 2013 || Mount Lemmon || Mount Lemmon Survey ||  || align=right | 2.7 km || 
|-id=098 bgcolor=#d6d6d6
| 560098 ||  || — || January 26, 2015 || Haleakala || Pan-STARRS ||  || align=right | 2.4 km || 
|-id=099 bgcolor=#d6d6d6
| 560099 ||  || — || December 3, 2013 || Haleakala || Pan-STARRS ||  || align=right | 2.0 km || 
|-id=100 bgcolor=#d6d6d6
| 560100 ||  || — || November 8, 2008 || Mount Lemmon || Mount Lemmon Survey ||  || align=right | 1.7 km || 
|}

560101–560200 

|-bgcolor=#d6d6d6
| 560101 ||  || — || January 24, 2015 || Haleakala || Pan-STARRS ||  || align=right | 2.4 km || 
|-id=102 bgcolor=#d6d6d6
| 560102 ||  || — || November 27, 2013 || Haleakala || Pan-STARRS ||  || align=right | 2.2 km || 
|-id=103 bgcolor=#d6d6d6
| 560103 ||  || — || January 18, 2009 || Kitt Peak || Spacewatch ||  || align=right | 2.5 km || 
|-id=104 bgcolor=#d6d6d6
| 560104 ||  || — || October 8, 2007 || Mount Lemmon || Mount Lemmon Survey ||  || align=right | 2.3 km || 
|-id=105 bgcolor=#d6d6d6
| 560105 ||  || — || August 13, 2012 || Haleakala || Pan-STARRS ||  || align=right | 3.5 km || 
|-id=106 bgcolor=#d6d6d6
| 560106 ||  || — || November 28, 2013 || Mount Lemmon || Mount Lemmon Survey ||  || align=right | 2.3 km || 
|-id=107 bgcolor=#d6d6d6
| 560107 ||  || — || August 8, 2012 || Haleakala || Pan-STARRS ||  || align=right | 2.8 km || 
|-id=108 bgcolor=#d6d6d6
| 560108 ||  || — || October 26, 2013 || Mount Lemmon || Mount Lemmon Survey ||  || align=right | 2.7 km || 
|-id=109 bgcolor=#d6d6d6
| 560109 ||  || — || November 27, 2013 || Haleakala || Pan-STARRS ||  || align=right | 2.5 km || 
|-id=110 bgcolor=#d6d6d6
| 560110 ||  || — || September 27, 1997 || Kitt Peak || Spacewatch ||  || align=right | 2.6 km || 
|-id=111 bgcolor=#d6d6d6
| 560111 ||  || — || February 24, 2015 || Haleakala || Pan-STARRS ||  || align=right | 2.2 km || 
|-id=112 bgcolor=#d6d6d6
| 560112 ||  || — || January 16, 2009 || Mount Lemmon || Mount Lemmon Survey ||  || align=right | 2.0 km || 
|-id=113 bgcolor=#d6d6d6
| 560113 ||  || — || October 8, 2007 || Mount Lemmon || Mount Lemmon Survey ||  || align=right | 2.9 km || 
|-id=114 bgcolor=#d6d6d6
| 560114 ||  || — || November 6, 2013 || Haleakala || Pan-STARRS ||  || align=right | 2.2 km || 
|-id=115 bgcolor=#d6d6d6
| 560115 ||  || — || September 15, 2013 || Mount Lemmon || Mount Lemmon Survey ||  || align=right | 2.3 km || 
|-id=116 bgcolor=#d6d6d6
| 560116 ||  || — || February 20, 2015 || Haleakala || Pan-STARRS ||  || align=right | 2.4 km || 
|-id=117 bgcolor=#d6d6d6
| 560117 ||  || — || August 26, 2012 || Haleakala || Pan-STARRS ||  || align=right | 2.1 km || 
|-id=118 bgcolor=#d6d6d6
| 560118 ||  || — || January 20, 2009 || Kitt Peak || Spacewatch ||  || align=right | 3.1 km || 
|-id=119 bgcolor=#d6d6d6
| 560119 ||  || — || October 20, 2007 || Kitt Peak || Spacewatch ||  || align=right | 2.1 km || 
|-id=120 bgcolor=#d6d6d6
| 560120 ||  || — || January 20, 2015 || Haleakala || Pan-STARRS ||  || align=right | 2.3 km || 
|-id=121 bgcolor=#d6d6d6
| 560121 ||  || — || June 17, 2010 || Mount Lemmon || Mount Lemmon Survey ||  || align=right | 2.8 km || 
|-id=122 bgcolor=#d6d6d6
| 560122 ||  || — || March 20, 2015 || Haleakala || Pan-STARRS ||  || align=right | 2.0 km || 
|-id=123 bgcolor=#d6d6d6
| 560123 ||  || — || October 11, 2012 || Haleakala || Pan-STARRS ||  || align=right | 2.3 km || 
|-id=124 bgcolor=#d6d6d6
| 560124 ||  || — || January 20, 2015 || Haleakala || Pan-STARRS ||  || align=right | 2.6 km || 
|-id=125 bgcolor=#d6d6d6
| 560125 ||  || — || October 23, 2012 || Mount Lemmon || Mount Lemmon Survey ||  || align=right | 2.1 km || 
|-id=126 bgcolor=#d6d6d6
| 560126 ||  || — || January 20, 2015 || Haleakala || Pan-STARRS ||  || align=right | 2.4 km || 
|-id=127 bgcolor=#d6d6d6
| 560127 ||  || — || August 2, 2011 || Haleakala || Pan-STARRS ||  || align=right | 2.9 km || 
|-id=128 bgcolor=#d6d6d6
| 560128 ||  || — || April 13, 2004 || Kitt Peak || Spacewatch ||  || align=right | 2.0 km || 
|-id=129 bgcolor=#d6d6d6
| 560129 ||  || — || March 28, 2004 || Kitt Peak || Spacewatch ||  || align=right | 2.6 km || 
|-id=130 bgcolor=#d6d6d6
| 560130 ||  || — || January 20, 2015 || Haleakala || Pan-STARRS ||  || align=right | 2.4 km || 
|-id=131 bgcolor=#d6d6d6
| 560131 ||  || — || September 26, 2006 || Kitt Peak || Spacewatch ||  || align=right | 2.8 km || 
|-id=132 bgcolor=#E9E9E9
| 560132 ||  || — || March 20, 2015 || Haleakala || Pan-STARRS ||  || align=right | 2.0 km || 
|-id=133 bgcolor=#d6d6d6
| 560133 ||  || — || September 19, 2012 || Mount Lemmon || Mount Lemmon Survey ||  || align=right | 2.7 km || 
|-id=134 bgcolor=#d6d6d6
| 560134 ||  || — || December 4, 2007 || Mount Lemmon || Mount Lemmon Survey ||  || align=right | 2.5 km || 
|-id=135 bgcolor=#d6d6d6
| 560135 ||  || — || August 24, 2011 || Haleakala || Pan-STARRS ||  || align=right | 2.4 km || 
|-id=136 bgcolor=#fefefe
| 560136 ||  || — || August 23, 2003 || Cerro Tololo || Cerro Tololo Obs. ||  || align=right data-sort-value="0.68" | 680 m || 
|-id=137 bgcolor=#d6d6d6
| 560137 ||  || — || August 31, 2005 || Kitt Peak || Spacewatch ||  || align=right | 2.9 km || 
|-id=138 bgcolor=#d6d6d6
| 560138 ||  || — || March 20, 2015 || Haleakala || Pan-STARRS ||  || align=right | 2.3 km || 
|-id=139 bgcolor=#d6d6d6
| 560139 ||  || — || September 24, 2012 || Mount Lemmon || Mount Lemmon Survey ||  || align=right | 3.1 km || 
|-id=140 bgcolor=#d6d6d6
| 560140 ||  || — || January 23, 2015 || Haleakala || Pan-STARRS ||  || align=right | 2.3 km || 
|-id=141 bgcolor=#d6d6d6
| 560141 ||  || — || October 21, 2007 || Kitt Peak || Spacewatch ||  || align=right | 2.9 km || 
|-id=142 bgcolor=#d6d6d6
| 560142 ||  || — || May 10, 2004 || Catalina || CSS ||  || align=right | 2.5 km || 
|-id=143 bgcolor=#d6d6d6
| 560143 ||  || — || June 9, 2011 || Mount Lemmon || Mount Lemmon Survey ||  || align=right | 3.5 km || 
|-id=144 bgcolor=#d6d6d6
| 560144 ||  || — || September 14, 2006 || Kitt Peak || Spacewatch ||  || align=right | 3.1 km || 
|-id=145 bgcolor=#d6d6d6
| 560145 ||  || — || April 10, 2010 || Mount Lemmon || Mount Lemmon Survey ||  || align=right | 2.0 km || 
|-id=146 bgcolor=#d6d6d6
| 560146 ||  || — || February 16, 2015 || Haleakala || Pan-STARRS ||  || align=right | 2.2 km || 
|-id=147 bgcolor=#d6d6d6
| 560147 ||  || — || September 19, 2001 || Kitt Peak || Spacewatch ||  || align=right | 2.6 km || 
|-id=148 bgcolor=#d6d6d6
| 560148 ||  || — || January 21, 2015 || Haleakala || Pan-STARRS ||  || align=right | 2.1 km || 
|-id=149 bgcolor=#d6d6d6
| 560149 ||  || — || October 19, 2006 || Mount Lemmon || Mount Lemmon Survey ||  || align=right | 3.5 km || 
|-id=150 bgcolor=#d6d6d6
| 560150 ||  || — || March 19, 2015 || Haleakala || Pan-STARRS ||  || align=right | 1.8 km || 
|-id=151 bgcolor=#d6d6d6
| 560151 ||  || — || October 3, 2013 || Mount Lemmon || Mount Lemmon Survey ||  || align=right | 2.8 km || 
|-id=152 bgcolor=#fefefe
| 560152 ||  || — || January 28, 2015 || Haleakala || Pan-STARRS || H || align=right data-sort-value="0.56" | 560 m || 
|-id=153 bgcolor=#d6d6d6
| 560153 ||  || — || May 31, 2011 || Mount Lemmon || Mount Lemmon Survey ||  || align=right | 2.9 km || 
|-id=154 bgcolor=#d6d6d6
| 560154 ||  || — || November 2, 2013 || Kitt Peak || Spacewatch ||  || align=right | 3.3 km || 
|-id=155 bgcolor=#d6d6d6
| 560155 ||  || — || November 8, 2008 || Kitt Peak || Spacewatch ||  || align=right | 2.1 km || 
|-id=156 bgcolor=#d6d6d6
| 560156 ||  || — || October 23, 2008 || Mount Lemmon || Mount Lemmon Survey ||  || align=right | 2.1 km || 
|-id=157 bgcolor=#d6d6d6
| 560157 ||  || — || November 19, 2008 || Kitt Peak || Spacewatch ||  || align=right | 2.9 km || 
|-id=158 bgcolor=#d6d6d6
| 560158 ||  || — || November 1, 2013 || Kitt Peak || Spacewatch ||  || align=right | 2.7 km || 
|-id=159 bgcolor=#d6d6d6
| 560159 ||  || — || October 3, 2013 || Kitt Peak || Spacewatch ||  || align=right | 2.6 km || 
|-id=160 bgcolor=#d6d6d6
| 560160 ||  || — || October 12, 2013 || Kitt Peak || Spacewatch ||  || align=right | 2.7 km || 
|-id=161 bgcolor=#d6d6d6
| 560161 ||  || — || October 25, 2013 || Kitt Peak || Spacewatch ||  || align=right | 2.5 km || 
|-id=162 bgcolor=#d6d6d6
| 560162 ||  || — || December 30, 2014 || Haleakala || Pan-STARRS ||  || align=right | 3.0 km || 
|-id=163 bgcolor=#E9E9E9
| 560163 ||  || — || August 25, 2003 || Palomar || NEAT ||  || align=right | 2.6 km || 
|-id=164 bgcolor=#d6d6d6
| 560164 ||  || — || December 27, 2014 || Haleakala || Pan-STARRS ||  || align=right | 2.7 km || 
|-id=165 bgcolor=#d6d6d6
| 560165 ||  || — || November 1, 2013 || Catalina || CSS ||  || align=right | 3.6 km || 
|-id=166 bgcolor=#d6d6d6
| 560166 ||  || — || December 1, 1996 || Kitt Peak || Spacewatch ||  || align=right | 3.5 km || 
|-id=167 bgcolor=#d6d6d6
| 560167 ||  || — || January 15, 2015 || Haleakala || Pan-STARRS ||  || align=right | 2.0 km || 
|-id=168 bgcolor=#d6d6d6
| 560168 ||  || — || September 27, 2013 || Haleakala || Pan-STARRS ||  || align=right | 3.2 km || 
|-id=169 bgcolor=#d6d6d6
| 560169 ||  || — || January 29, 2015 || Haleakala || Pan-STARRS ||  || align=right | 2.6 km || 
|-id=170 bgcolor=#d6d6d6
| 560170 ||  || — || October 5, 2013 || Kitt Peak || Spacewatch ||  || align=right | 3.2 km || 
|-id=171 bgcolor=#E9E9E9
| 560171 ||  || — || October 30, 2005 || Kitt Peak || Spacewatch ||  || align=right data-sort-value="0.98" | 980 m || 
|-id=172 bgcolor=#d6d6d6
| 560172 ||  || — || January 23, 2015 || Haleakala || Pan-STARRS ||  || align=right | 2.6 km || 
|-id=173 bgcolor=#d6d6d6
| 560173 ||  || — || October 10, 2007 || Kitt Peak || Spacewatch ||  || align=right | 2.6 km || 
|-id=174 bgcolor=#E9E9E9
| 560174 ||  || — || February 16, 2015 || Haleakala || Pan-STARRS ||  || align=right | 1.2 km || 
|-id=175 bgcolor=#d6d6d6
| 560175 ||  || — || August 29, 2006 || Catalina || CSS ||  || align=right | 2.4 km || 
|-id=176 bgcolor=#d6d6d6
| 560176 ||  || — || March 19, 2010 || Kitt Peak || Spacewatch ||  || align=right | 2.5 km || 
|-id=177 bgcolor=#d6d6d6
| 560177 ||  || — || January 20, 2015 || Haleakala || Pan-STARRS ||  || align=right | 2.3 km || 
|-id=178 bgcolor=#d6d6d6
| 560178 ||  || — || April 4, 2010 || Kitt Peak || Spacewatch ||  || align=right | 2.2 km || 
|-id=179 bgcolor=#d6d6d6
| 560179 ||  || — || October 8, 2007 || Mount Lemmon || Mount Lemmon Survey ||  || align=right | 2.5 km || 
|-id=180 bgcolor=#d6d6d6
| 560180 ||  || — || September 24, 2006 || Kitt Peak || Spacewatch ||  || align=right | 2.5 km || 
|-id=181 bgcolor=#d6d6d6
| 560181 ||  || — || October 8, 2007 || Mount Lemmon || Mount Lemmon Survey ||  || align=right | 2.0 km || 
|-id=182 bgcolor=#d6d6d6
| 560182 ||  || — || March 21, 2015 || Haleakala || Pan-STARRS ||  || align=right | 1.9 km || 
|-id=183 bgcolor=#d6d6d6
| 560183 ||  || — || October 15, 2012 || Haleakala || Pan-STARRS ||  || align=right | 2.4 km || 
|-id=184 bgcolor=#d6d6d6
| 560184 ||  || — || March 3, 2009 || Mount Lemmon || Mount Lemmon Survey ||  || align=right | 2.8 km || 
|-id=185 bgcolor=#d6d6d6
| 560185 ||  || — || February 14, 2004 || Palomar || NEAT ||  || align=right | 2.8 km || 
|-id=186 bgcolor=#d6d6d6
| 560186 ||  || — || September 27, 2002 || Palomar || NEAT || Tj (2.95) || align=right | 2.3 km || 
|-id=187 bgcolor=#C2FFFF
| 560187 ||  || — || September 28, 2009 || Kitt Peak || Spacewatch || L4 || align=right | 6.9 km || 
|-id=188 bgcolor=#d6d6d6
| 560188 ||  || — || February 26, 2009 || Kitt Peak || Spacewatch ||  || align=right | 2.4 km || 
|-id=189 bgcolor=#d6d6d6
| 560189 ||  || — || September 17, 2006 || Kitt Peak || Spacewatch ||  || align=right | 2.5 km || 
|-id=190 bgcolor=#d6d6d6
| 560190 ||  || — || February 17, 2004 || Kitt Peak || Spacewatch ||  || align=right | 2.3 km || 
|-id=191 bgcolor=#d6d6d6
| 560191 ||  || — || March 21, 2015 || Haleakala || Pan-STARRS ||  || align=right | 2.3 km || 
|-id=192 bgcolor=#d6d6d6
| 560192 ||  || — || March 21, 2015 || Haleakala || Pan-STARRS ||  || align=right | 2.6 km || 
|-id=193 bgcolor=#d6d6d6
| 560193 ||  || — || November 11, 2001 || Apache Point || SDSS Collaboration ||  || align=right | 2.3 km || 
|-id=194 bgcolor=#d6d6d6
| 560194 ||  || — || August 28, 2012 || Mount Lemmon || Mount Lemmon Survey ||  || align=right | 3.4 km || 
|-id=195 bgcolor=#d6d6d6
| 560195 ||  || — || September 2, 2005 || Palomar || NEAT ||  || align=right | 4.4 km || 
|-id=196 bgcolor=#d6d6d6
| 560196 ||  || — || August 19, 2006 || Kitt Peak || Spacewatch || VER || align=right | 3.2 km || 
|-id=197 bgcolor=#d6d6d6
| 560197 ||  || — || January 4, 2014 || Mount Lemmon || Mount Lemmon Survey ||  || align=right | 2.7 km || 
|-id=198 bgcolor=#d6d6d6
| 560198 ||  || — || January 23, 2015 || Haleakala || Pan-STARRS ||  || align=right | 2.7 km || 
|-id=199 bgcolor=#d6d6d6
| 560199 ||  || — || July 21, 2006 || Mount Lemmon || Mount Lemmon Survey ||  || align=right | 2.8 km || 
|-id=200 bgcolor=#d6d6d6
| 560200 ||  || — || March 8, 2003 || Kitt Peak || Spacewatch ||  || align=right | 2.9 km || 
|}

560201–560300 

|-bgcolor=#d6d6d6
| 560201 ||  || — || March 21, 2015 || Haleakala || Pan-STARRS ||  || align=right | 2.5 km || 
|-id=202 bgcolor=#d6d6d6
| 560202 ||  || — || October 18, 2012 || Haleakala || Pan-STARRS ||  || align=right | 2.3 km || 
|-id=203 bgcolor=#d6d6d6
| 560203 ||  || — || June 29, 2005 || Kitt Peak || Spacewatch ||  || align=right | 2.9 km || 
|-id=204 bgcolor=#d6d6d6
| 560204 ||  || — || October 8, 2012 || Kitt Peak || Spacewatch ||  || align=right | 2.3 km || 
|-id=205 bgcolor=#d6d6d6
| 560205 ||  || — || October 22, 2006 || Catalina || CSS || EOS || align=right | 2.5 km || 
|-id=206 bgcolor=#d6d6d6
| 560206 ||  || — || July 30, 2005 || Palomar || NEAT ||  || align=right | 3.6 km || 
|-id=207 bgcolor=#d6d6d6
| 560207 ||  || — || January 28, 2015 || Haleakala || Pan-STARRS ||  || align=right | 2.7 km || 
|-id=208 bgcolor=#d6d6d6
| 560208 ||  || — || January 28, 2015 || Haleakala || Pan-STARRS ||  || align=right | 2.8 km || 
|-id=209 bgcolor=#d6d6d6
| 560209 ||  || — || June 11, 2011 || Haleakala || Pan-STARRS ||  || align=right | 3.6 km || 
|-id=210 bgcolor=#d6d6d6
| 560210 ||  || — || March 7, 2008 || Mount Lemmon || Mount Lemmon Survey || 7:4 || align=right | 4.2 km || 
|-id=211 bgcolor=#d6d6d6
| 560211 ||  || — || October 17, 2012 || Haleakala || Pan-STARRS ||  || align=right | 2.7 km || 
|-id=212 bgcolor=#d6d6d6
| 560212 ||  || — || January 18, 2009 || Mount Lemmon || Mount Lemmon Survey ||  || align=right | 1.9 km || 
|-id=213 bgcolor=#d6d6d6
| 560213 ||  || — || October 18, 2012 || Haleakala || Pan-STARRS ||  || align=right | 2.4 km || 
|-id=214 bgcolor=#d6d6d6
| 560214 ||  || — || April 10, 2010 || Mount Lemmon || Mount Lemmon Survey ||  || align=right | 2.2 km || 
|-id=215 bgcolor=#d6d6d6
| 560215 ||  || — || October 11, 2012 || Haleakala || Pan-STARRS ||  || align=right | 2.8 km || 
|-id=216 bgcolor=#d6d6d6
| 560216 ||  || — || January 18, 2009 || Kitt Peak || Spacewatch ||  || align=right | 2.2 km || 
|-id=217 bgcolor=#d6d6d6
| 560217 ||  || — || September 20, 2001 || Kitt Peak || Spacewatch ||  || align=right | 2.4 km || 
|-id=218 bgcolor=#d6d6d6
| 560218 ||  || — || August 28, 2013 || Mount Lemmon || Mount Lemmon Survey || Tj (2.98) || align=right | 2.8 km || 
|-id=219 bgcolor=#d6d6d6
| 560219 ||  || — || June 21, 2006 || Catalina || CSS ||  || align=right | 3.5 km || 
|-id=220 bgcolor=#d6d6d6
| 560220 ||  || — || October 10, 2012 || Mount Lemmon || Mount Lemmon Survey ||  || align=right | 2.5 km || 
|-id=221 bgcolor=#d6d6d6
| 560221 ||  || — || November 28, 2013 || Mount Lemmon || Mount Lemmon Survey ||  || align=right | 3.0 km || 
|-id=222 bgcolor=#d6d6d6
| 560222 ||  || — || January 18, 2015 || Haleakala || Pan-STARRS ||  || align=right | 2.8 km || 
|-id=223 bgcolor=#d6d6d6
| 560223 ||  || — || October 10, 2007 || Catalina || CSS || Tj (2.99) || align=right | 2.7 km || 
|-id=224 bgcolor=#d6d6d6
| 560224 ||  || — || February 23, 2015 || Haleakala || Pan-STARRS ||  || align=right | 3.1 km || 
|-id=225 bgcolor=#d6d6d6
| 560225 ||  || — || December 30, 2008 || Mount Lemmon || Mount Lemmon Survey ||  || align=right | 2.7 km || 
|-id=226 bgcolor=#d6d6d6
| 560226 ||  || — || October 22, 2008 || Kitt Peak || Spacewatch ||  || align=right | 2.4 km || 
|-id=227 bgcolor=#d6d6d6
| 560227 ||  || — || February 23, 2015 || Haleakala || Pan-STARRS ||  || align=right | 2.7 km || 
|-id=228 bgcolor=#d6d6d6
| 560228 ||  || — || September 13, 2012 || ESA OGS || ESA OGS ||  || align=right | 2.9 km || 
|-id=229 bgcolor=#fefefe
| 560229 ||  || — || February 20, 2015 || Haleakala || Pan-STARRS ||  || align=right data-sort-value="0.44" | 440 m || 
|-id=230 bgcolor=#d6d6d6
| 560230 ||  || — || August 20, 2001 || Cerro Tololo || Cerro Tololo Obs. ||  || align=right | 2.1 km || 
|-id=231 bgcolor=#d6d6d6
| 560231 ||  || — || August 29, 2006 || Catalina || CSS ||  || align=right | 2.8 km || 
|-id=232 bgcolor=#d6d6d6
| 560232 ||  || — || September 28, 2013 || Mount Lemmon || Mount Lemmon Survey ||  || align=right | 2.0 km || 
|-id=233 bgcolor=#d6d6d6
| 560233 ||  || — || December 31, 2008 || Mount Lemmon || Mount Lemmon Survey ||  || align=right | 2.7 km || 
|-id=234 bgcolor=#d6d6d6
| 560234 ||  || — || January 23, 2015 || Haleakala || Pan-STARRS ||  || align=right | 2.7 km || 
|-id=235 bgcolor=#d6d6d6
| 560235 ||  || — || February 19, 2009 || Kitt Peak || Spacewatch ||  || align=right | 2.6 km || 
|-id=236 bgcolor=#d6d6d6
| 560236 ||  || — || October 5, 2012 || Haleakala || Pan-STARRS ||  || align=right | 2.6 km || 
|-id=237 bgcolor=#d6d6d6
| 560237 ||  || — || August 26, 2012 || Haleakala || Pan-STARRS ||  || align=right | 2.1 km || 
|-id=238 bgcolor=#d6d6d6
| 560238 ||  || — || April 9, 2010 || Mount Lemmon || Mount Lemmon Survey ||  || align=right | 2.2 km || 
|-id=239 bgcolor=#d6d6d6
| 560239 ||  || — || October 15, 2007 || Mount Lemmon || Mount Lemmon Survey ||  || align=right | 2.4 km || 
|-id=240 bgcolor=#d6d6d6
| 560240 ||  || — || August 25, 2012 || Kitt Peak || Spacewatch ||  || align=right | 2.8 km || 
|-id=241 bgcolor=#d6d6d6
| 560241 ||  || — || March 22, 2015 || Haleakala || Pan-STARRS ||  || align=right | 2.3 km || 
|-id=242 bgcolor=#d6d6d6
| 560242 ||  || — || December 4, 2013 || Haleakala || Pan-STARRS ||  || align=right | 3.3 km || 
|-id=243 bgcolor=#d6d6d6
| 560243 ||  || — || October 19, 2007 || Mount Lemmon || Mount Lemmon Survey ||  || align=right | 2.0 km || 
|-id=244 bgcolor=#d6d6d6
| 560244 ||  || — || February 16, 2015 || Haleakala || Pan-STARRS ||  || align=right | 2.3 km || 
|-id=245 bgcolor=#d6d6d6
| 560245 ||  || — || December 25, 2013 || Mount Lemmon || Mount Lemmon Survey ||  || align=right | 2.4 km || 
|-id=246 bgcolor=#d6d6d6
| 560246 ||  || — || March 22, 2015 || Haleakala || Pan-STARRS ||  || align=right | 2.7 km || 
|-id=247 bgcolor=#d6d6d6
| 560247 ||  || — || November 18, 2007 || Kitt Peak || Spacewatch ||  || align=right | 2.7 km || 
|-id=248 bgcolor=#d6d6d6
| 560248 ||  || — || October 12, 2007 || Kitt Peak || Spacewatch ||  || align=right | 2.4 km || 
|-id=249 bgcolor=#d6d6d6
| 560249 ||  || — || October 12, 2013 || Kitt Peak || Spacewatch ||  || align=right | 2.6 km || 
|-id=250 bgcolor=#d6d6d6
| 560250 ||  || — || September 28, 2013 || Mount Lemmon || Mount Lemmon Survey ||  || align=right | 2.5 km || 
|-id=251 bgcolor=#d6d6d6
| 560251 ||  || — || May 11, 2010 || Mount Lemmon || Mount Lemmon Survey ||  || align=right | 2.2 km || 
|-id=252 bgcolor=#d6d6d6
| 560252 ||  || — || September 1, 2013 || Mount Lemmon || Mount Lemmon Survey ||  || align=right | 2.7 km || 
|-id=253 bgcolor=#d6d6d6
| 560253 ||  || — || October 16, 2012 || Mount Lemmon || Mount Lemmon Survey ||  || align=right | 2.3 km || 
|-id=254 bgcolor=#d6d6d6
| 560254 ||  || — || August 18, 2006 || Kitt Peak || Spacewatch ||  || align=right | 2.4 km || 
|-id=255 bgcolor=#d6d6d6
| 560255 ||  || — || August 22, 1995 || Kitt Peak || Spacewatch ||  || align=right | 2.3 km || 
|-id=256 bgcolor=#d6d6d6
| 560256 ||  || — || November 10, 2013 || Mount Lemmon || Mount Lemmon Survey ||  || align=right | 2.1 km || 
|-id=257 bgcolor=#d6d6d6
| 560257 ||  || — || March 23, 2015 || Haleakala || Pan-STARRS ||  || align=right | 2.1 km || 
|-id=258 bgcolor=#d6d6d6
| 560258 ||  || — || January 31, 2009 || Mount Lemmon || Mount Lemmon Survey ||  || align=right | 2.0 km || 
|-id=259 bgcolor=#d6d6d6
| 560259 ||  || — || February 16, 2015 || Haleakala || Pan-STARRS ||  || align=right | 2.2 km || 
|-id=260 bgcolor=#d6d6d6
| 560260 ||  || — || December 22, 2008 || Kitt Peak || Spacewatch ||  || align=right | 2.1 km || 
|-id=261 bgcolor=#d6d6d6
| 560261 ||  || — || March 23, 2015 || Haleakala || Pan-STARRS ||  || align=right | 2.9 km || 
|-id=262 bgcolor=#d6d6d6
| 560262 ||  || — || September 18, 2011 || Mount Lemmon || Mount Lemmon Survey ||  || align=right | 2.5 km || 
|-id=263 bgcolor=#d6d6d6
| 560263 ||  || — || April 20, 2010 || Mount Lemmon || Mount Lemmon Survey ||  || align=right | 3.0 km || 
|-id=264 bgcolor=#d6d6d6
| 560264 ||  || — || February 16, 2015 || Haleakala || Pan-STARRS ||  || align=right | 2.3 km || 
|-id=265 bgcolor=#d6d6d6
| 560265 ||  || — || January 23, 2015 || Haleakala || Pan-STARRS ||  || align=right | 2.4 km || 
|-id=266 bgcolor=#d6d6d6
| 560266 ||  || — || April 9, 2010 || Mount Lemmon || Mount Lemmon Survey ||  || align=right | 2.7 km || 
|-id=267 bgcolor=#d6d6d6
| 560267 ||  || — || January 23, 2015 || Haleakala || Pan-STARRS ||  || align=right | 2.6 km || 
|-id=268 bgcolor=#d6d6d6
| 560268 ||  || — || June 5, 2011 || Mount Lemmon || Mount Lemmon Survey ||  || align=right | 2.6 km || 
|-id=269 bgcolor=#d6d6d6
| 560269 ||  || — || June 24, 2011 || Kitt Peak || Spacewatch ||  || align=right | 2.5 km || 
|-id=270 bgcolor=#d6d6d6
| 560270 ||  || — || August 17, 2012 || Haleakala || Pan-STARRS ||  || align=right | 2.4 km || 
|-id=271 bgcolor=#d6d6d6
| 560271 ||  || — || June 30, 2005 || Kitt Peak || Spacewatch ||  || align=right | 3.1 km || 
|-id=272 bgcolor=#d6d6d6
| 560272 ||  || — || January 1, 2009 || Mount Lemmon || Mount Lemmon Survey ||  || align=right | 2.8 km || 
|-id=273 bgcolor=#d6d6d6
| 560273 ||  || — || October 2, 2006 || Kitt Peak || Spacewatch ||  || align=right | 2.5 km || 
|-id=274 bgcolor=#d6d6d6
| 560274 ||  || — || February 4, 2009 || Mount Lemmon || Mount Lemmon Survey ||  || align=right | 2.4 km || 
|-id=275 bgcolor=#d6d6d6
| 560275 ||  || — || March 23, 2015 || Haleakala || Pan-STARRS ||  || align=right | 2.5 km || 
|-id=276 bgcolor=#d6d6d6
| 560276 ||  || — || May 7, 2010 || Mount Lemmon || Mount Lemmon Survey ||  || align=right | 2.4 km || 
|-id=277 bgcolor=#d6d6d6
| 560277 ||  || — || December 30, 2013 || Haleakala || Pan-STARRS ||  || align=right | 2.7 km || 
|-id=278 bgcolor=#d6d6d6
| 560278 ||  || — || January 21, 2015 || Haleakala || Pan-STARRS ||  || align=right | 2.5 km || 
|-id=279 bgcolor=#d6d6d6
| 560279 ||  || — || March 23, 2015 || Haleakala || Pan-STARRS ||  || align=right | 3.3 km || 
|-id=280 bgcolor=#d6d6d6
| 560280 ||  || — || March 23, 2015 || Haleakala || Pan-STARRS ||  || align=right | 2.5 km || 
|-id=281 bgcolor=#d6d6d6
| 560281 ||  || — || February 1, 2009 || Kitt Peak || Spacewatch ||  || align=right | 2.7 km || 
|-id=282 bgcolor=#d6d6d6
| 560282 ||  || — || September 15, 2012 || Catalina || CSS ||  || align=right | 3.2 km || 
|-id=283 bgcolor=#d6d6d6
| 560283 ||  || — || August 19, 2006 || Kitt Peak || Spacewatch ||  || align=right | 2.0 km || 
|-id=284 bgcolor=#d6d6d6
| 560284 ||  || — || March 23, 2015 || Haleakala || Pan-STARRS ||  || align=right | 2.0 km || 
|-id=285 bgcolor=#d6d6d6
| 560285 ||  || — || October 7, 2012 || Haleakala || Pan-STARRS ||  || align=right | 2.4 km || 
|-id=286 bgcolor=#d6d6d6
| 560286 ||  || — || February 18, 2015 || Haleakala || Pan-STARRS ||  || align=right | 2.2 km || 
|-id=287 bgcolor=#d6d6d6
| 560287 ||  || — || April 24, 2004 || Kitt Peak || Spacewatch ||  || align=right | 2.2 km || 
|-id=288 bgcolor=#d6d6d6
| 560288 ||  || — || September 10, 2007 || Kitt Peak || Spacewatch ||  || align=right | 2.3 km || 
|-id=289 bgcolor=#fefefe
| 560289 ||  || — || September 23, 2013 || Kitt Peak || Spacewatch ||  || align=right data-sort-value="0.52" | 520 m || 
|-id=290 bgcolor=#d6d6d6
| 560290 ||  || — || October 26, 2001 || Kitt Peak || Spacewatch ||  || align=right | 2.6 km || 
|-id=291 bgcolor=#d6d6d6
| 560291 ||  || — || March 18, 2004 || Kitt Peak || Spacewatch ||  || align=right | 2.3 km || 
|-id=292 bgcolor=#d6d6d6
| 560292 ||  || — || January 3, 2009 || Mount Lemmon || Mount Lemmon Survey ||  || align=right | 2.4 km || 
|-id=293 bgcolor=#d6d6d6
| 560293 ||  || — || October 12, 2007 || Kitt Peak || Spacewatch ||  || align=right | 2.3 km || 
|-id=294 bgcolor=#d6d6d6
| 560294 ||  || — || September 21, 2012 || Kitt Peak || Spacewatch ||  || align=right | 2.5 km || 
|-id=295 bgcolor=#d6d6d6
| 560295 ||  || — || May 26, 2011 || Mount Lemmon || Mount Lemmon Survey ||  || align=right | 2.7 km || 
|-id=296 bgcolor=#d6d6d6
| 560296 ||  || — || September 19, 2006 || Catalina || CSS ||  || align=right | 3.0 km || 
|-id=297 bgcolor=#d6d6d6
| 560297 ||  || — || February 15, 2015 || Haleakala || Pan-STARRS ||  || align=right | 2.3 km || 
|-id=298 bgcolor=#d6d6d6
| 560298 ||  || — || April 10, 2010 || Mount Lemmon || Mount Lemmon Survey ||  || align=right | 1.7 km || 
|-id=299 bgcolor=#d6d6d6
| 560299 ||  || — || November 27, 2013 || Haleakala || Pan-STARRS ||  || align=right | 2.0 km || 
|-id=300 bgcolor=#d6d6d6
| 560300 ||  || — || August 17, 2012 || Haleakala || Pan-STARRS ||  || align=right | 2.1 km || 
|}

560301–560400 

|-bgcolor=#d6d6d6
| 560301 ||  || — || September 19, 2007 || Kitt Peak || Spacewatch ||  || align=right | 3.1 km || 
|-id=302 bgcolor=#d6d6d6
| 560302 ||  || — || December 22, 1998 || Kitt Peak || Spacewatch ||  || align=right | 2.7 km || 
|-id=303 bgcolor=#d6d6d6
| 560303 ||  || — || September 15, 2007 || Mount Lemmon || Mount Lemmon Survey ||  || align=right | 3.2 km || 
|-id=304 bgcolor=#d6d6d6
| 560304 ||  || — || January 25, 2009 || Kitt Peak || Spacewatch ||  || align=right | 2.5 km || 
|-id=305 bgcolor=#d6d6d6
| 560305 ||  || — || January 18, 2009 || Kitt Peak || Spacewatch ||  || align=right | 2.7 km || 
|-id=306 bgcolor=#d6d6d6
| 560306 ||  || — || February 16, 2015 || Haleakala || Pan-STARRS ||  || align=right | 2.1 km || 
|-id=307 bgcolor=#d6d6d6
| 560307 ||  || — || January 1, 2009 || Kitt Peak || Spacewatch ||  || align=right | 2.8 km || 
|-id=308 bgcolor=#d6d6d6
| 560308 ||  || — || March 16, 2010 || Kitt Peak || Spacewatch ||  || align=right | 2.2 km || 
|-id=309 bgcolor=#d6d6d6
| 560309 ||  || — || February 18, 2015 || Kitt Peak || L. H. Wasserman, M. W. Buie ||  || align=right | 1.8 km || 
|-id=310 bgcolor=#d6d6d6
| 560310 ||  || — || November 2, 2007 || Mount Lemmon || Mount Lemmon Survey ||  || align=right | 2.3 km || 
|-id=311 bgcolor=#d6d6d6
| 560311 ||  || — || February 18, 2015 || Haleakala || Pan-STARRS ||  || align=right | 2.2 km || 
|-id=312 bgcolor=#fefefe
| 560312 ||  || — || February 19, 2015 || Haleakala || Pan-STARRS ||  || align=right data-sort-value="0.61" | 610 m || 
|-id=313 bgcolor=#E9E9E9
| 560313 ||  || — || February 16, 2015 || Haleakala || Pan-STARRS ||  || align=right | 1.6 km || 
|-id=314 bgcolor=#d6d6d6
| 560314 ||  || — || November 10, 1996 || Kitt Peak || Spacewatch ||  || align=right | 2.7 km || 
|-id=315 bgcolor=#d6d6d6
| 560315 ||  || — || March 18, 2010 || Mount Lemmon || Mount Lemmon Survey ||  || align=right | 2.5 km || 
|-id=316 bgcolor=#d6d6d6
| 560316 ||  || — || September 14, 2007 || Kitt Peak || Spacewatch ||  || align=right | 2.1 km || 
|-id=317 bgcolor=#d6d6d6
| 560317 ||  || — || January 28, 2015 || Haleakala || Pan-STARRS ||  || align=right | 2.2 km || 
|-id=318 bgcolor=#d6d6d6
| 560318 ||  || — || November 9, 2013 || Kitt Peak || Spacewatch ||  || align=right | 2.1 km || 
|-id=319 bgcolor=#d6d6d6
| 560319 ||  || — || January 21, 2015 || Haleakala || Pan-STARRS ||  || align=right | 2.5 km || 
|-id=320 bgcolor=#d6d6d6
| 560320 ||  || — || January 21, 2015 || Haleakala || Pan-STARRS ||  || align=right | 2.0 km || 
|-id=321 bgcolor=#d6d6d6
| 560321 ||  || — || November 28, 2013 || Haleakala || Pan-STARRS ||  || align=right | 2.7 km || 
|-id=322 bgcolor=#d6d6d6
| 560322 ||  || — || January 21, 2015 || Haleakala || Pan-STARRS ||  || align=right | 2.6 km || 
|-id=323 bgcolor=#d6d6d6
| 560323 ||  || — || February 17, 2015 || Haleakala || Pan-STARRS ||  || align=right | 2.5 km || 
|-id=324 bgcolor=#d6d6d6
| 560324 ||  || — || July 28, 2011 || Haleakala || Pan-STARRS ||  || align=right | 2.5 km || 
|-id=325 bgcolor=#d6d6d6
| 560325 ||  || — || May 8, 2010 || Mount Lemmon || Mount Lemmon Survey ||  || align=right | 2.7 km || 
|-id=326 bgcolor=#d6d6d6
| 560326 ||  || — || February 17, 2015 || Haleakala || Pan-STARRS ||  || align=right | 2.4 km || 
|-id=327 bgcolor=#d6d6d6
| 560327 ||  || — || February 17, 2015 || Haleakala || Pan-STARRS ||  || align=right | 2.2 km || 
|-id=328 bgcolor=#d6d6d6
| 560328 ||  || — || May 5, 2010 || Catalina || CSS ||  || align=right | 2.3 km || 
|-id=329 bgcolor=#d6d6d6
| 560329 ||  || — || October 16, 2012 || Mount Lemmon || Mount Lemmon Survey ||  || align=right | 2.4 km || 
|-id=330 bgcolor=#d6d6d6
| 560330 ||  || — || January 21, 2015 || Haleakala || Pan-STARRS ||  || align=right | 2.2 km || 
|-id=331 bgcolor=#d6d6d6
| 560331 ||  || — || October 15, 2012 || Haleakala || Pan-STARRS ||  || align=right | 2.5 km || 
|-id=332 bgcolor=#d6d6d6
| 560332 ||  || — || April 8, 2010 || Kitt Peak || Spacewatch ||  || align=right | 2.9 km || 
|-id=333 bgcolor=#d6d6d6
| 560333 ||  || — || May 28, 2011 || Mount Lemmon || Mount Lemmon Survey ||  || align=right | 3.2 km || 
|-id=334 bgcolor=#d6d6d6
| 560334 ||  || — || October 11, 2012 || Mount Lemmon || Mount Lemmon Survey ||  || align=right | 2.5 km || 
|-id=335 bgcolor=#d6d6d6
| 560335 ||  || — || September 13, 2007 || Mount Lemmon || Mount Lemmon Survey ||  || align=right | 2.9 km || 
|-id=336 bgcolor=#d6d6d6
| 560336 ||  || — || January 1, 2009 || Kitt Peak || Spacewatch ||  || align=right | 1.9 km || 
|-id=337 bgcolor=#d6d6d6
| 560337 ||  || — || October 20, 2007 || Mount Lemmon || Mount Lemmon Survey ||  || align=right | 2.3 km || 
|-id=338 bgcolor=#d6d6d6
| 560338 ||  || — || November 3, 2007 || Mount Lemmon || Mount Lemmon Survey ||  || align=right | 2.4 km || 
|-id=339 bgcolor=#E9E9E9
| 560339 ||  || — || January 19, 2015 || Haleakala || Pan-STARRS ||  || align=right data-sort-value="0.83" | 830 m || 
|-id=340 bgcolor=#d6d6d6
| 560340 ||  || — || September 14, 2007 || Mount Lemmon || Mount Lemmon Survey ||  || align=right | 2.8 km || 
|-id=341 bgcolor=#d6d6d6
| 560341 ||  || — || February 28, 2009 || Mount Lemmon || Mount Lemmon Survey ||  || align=right | 2.5 km || 
|-id=342 bgcolor=#d6d6d6
| 560342 ||  || — || February 11, 2004 || Kitt Peak || Spacewatch ||  || align=right | 2.5 km || 
|-id=343 bgcolor=#d6d6d6
| 560343 ||  || — || November 24, 2008 || Kitt Peak || Spacewatch ||  || align=right | 1.8 km || 
|-id=344 bgcolor=#d6d6d6
| 560344 ||  || — || December 29, 2014 || Haleakala || Pan-STARRS ||  || align=right | 2.6 km || 
|-id=345 bgcolor=#d6d6d6
| 560345 ||  || — || December 30, 2008 || Kitt Peak || Spacewatch ||  || align=right | 2.3 km || 
|-id=346 bgcolor=#d6d6d6
| 560346 ||  || — || December 4, 2007 || Catalina || CSS ||  || align=right | 4.6 km || 
|-id=347 bgcolor=#d6d6d6
| 560347 ||  || — || October 3, 2013 || Haleakala || Pan-STARRS ||  || align=right | 2.8 km || 
|-id=348 bgcolor=#d6d6d6
| 560348 ||  || — || January 27, 2015 || Haleakala || Pan-STARRS ||  || align=right | 2.6 km || 
|-id=349 bgcolor=#d6d6d6
| 560349 ||  || — || April 11, 2010 || Mount Lemmon || Mount Lemmon Survey ||  || align=right | 2.9 km || 
|-id=350 bgcolor=#d6d6d6
| 560350 ||  || — || August 2, 2011 || Charleston || R. Holmes ||  || align=right | 3.0 km || 
|-id=351 bgcolor=#d6d6d6
| 560351 ||  || — || January 3, 2009 || Mount Lemmon || Mount Lemmon Survey ||  || align=right | 2.6 km || 
|-id=352 bgcolor=#d6d6d6
| 560352 ||  || — || December 19, 2003 || Kitt Peak || Spacewatch ||  || align=right | 2.4 km || 
|-id=353 bgcolor=#d6d6d6
| 560353 ||  || — || December 21, 2008 || Mount Lemmon || Mount Lemmon Survey ||  || align=right | 3.1 km || 
|-id=354 bgcolor=#d6d6d6
| 560354 Chrisnolan ||  ||  || November 26, 2013 || Tincana || M. Żołnowski, M. Kusiak ||  || align=right | 2.7 km || 
|-id=355 bgcolor=#d6d6d6
| 560355 ||  || — || January 1, 2009 || Kitt Peak || Spacewatch ||  || align=right | 2.4 km || 
|-id=356 bgcolor=#d6d6d6
| 560356 ||  || — || May 14, 2010 || Mount Lemmon || Mount Lemmon Survey ||  || align=right | 2.8 km || 
|-id=357 bgcolor=#d6d6d6
| 560357 ||  || — || September 19, 2007 || Kitt Peak || Spacewatch ||  || align=right | 2.4 km || 
|-id=358 bgcolor=#d6d6d6
| 560358 ||  || — || September 17, 2006 || Kitt Peak || Spacewatch ||  || align=right | 2.6 km || 
|-id=359 bgcolor=#d6d6d6
| 560359 ||  || — || October 9, 2007 || Kitt Peak || Spacewatch || TIR || align=right | 2.5 km || 
|-id=360 bgcolor=#d6d6d6
| 560360 ||  || — || November 12, 2012 || Haleakala || Pan-STARRS ||  || align=right | 4.4 km || 
|-id=361 bgcolor=#d6d6d6
| 560361 ||  || — || August 6, 2005 || Palomar || NEAT ||  || align=right | 3.0 km || 
|-id=362 bgcolor=#d6d6d6
| 560362 ||  || — || March 28, 2015 || Haleakala || Pan-STARRS ||  || align=right | 2.6 km || 
|-id=363 bgcolor=#d6d6d6
| 560363 ||  || — || January 22, 2015 || Haleakala || Pan-STARRS ||  || align=right | 2.5 km || 
|-id=364 bgcolor=#d6d6d6
| 560364 ||  || — || January 22, 2015 || Haleakala || Pan-STARRS ||  || align=right | 3.2 km || 
|-id=365 bgcolor=#d6d6d6
| 560365 ||  || — || November 11, 2007 || Kitt Peak || Mount Lemmon Survey ||  || align=right | 4.3 km || 
|-id=366 bgcolor=#d6d6d6
| 560366 ||  || — || March 23, 2003 || Apache Point || SDSS Collaboration ||  || align=right | 3.1 km || 
|-id=367 bgcolor=#d6d6d6
| 560367 ||  || — || March 21, 2004 || Kitt Peak || Spacewatch ||  || align=right | 2.5 km || 
|-id=368 bgcolor=#d6d6d6
| 560368 ||  || — || January 14, 2002 || Palomar || NEAT ||  || align=right | 3.7 km || 
|-id=369 bgcolor=#d6d6d6
| 560369 ||  || — || February 1, 2003 || Kitt Peak || Spacewatch ||  || align=right | 3.0 km || 
|-id=370 bgcolor=#E9E9E9
| 560370 ||  || — || March 28, 2015 || Haleakala || Pan-STARRS ||  || align=right | 1.1 km || 
|-id=371 bgcolor=#fefefe
| 560371 ||  || — || March 28, 2015 || Haleakala || Pan-STARRS ||  || align=right data-sort-value="0.77" | 770 m || 
|-id=372 bgcolor=#d6d6d6
| 560372 ||  || — || January 23, 2015 || Haleakala || Pan-STARRS ||  || align=right | 2.2 km || 
|-id=373 bgcolor=#d6d6d6
| 560373 ||  || — || November 11, 2001 || Apache Point || SDSS Collaboration ||  || align=right | 2.2 km || 
|-id=374 bgcolor=#d6d6d6
| 560374 ||  || — || November 18, 2007 || Kitt Peak || Spacewatch ||  || align=right | 2.6 km || 
|-id=375 bgcolor=#d6d6d6
| 560375 ||  || — || December 5, 2007 || Kitt Peak || Spacewatch ||  || align=right | 3.0 km || 
|-id=376 bgcolor=#d6d6d6
| 560376 ||  || — || December 30, 2013 || Haleakala || Pan-STARRS ||  || align=right | 2.5 km || 
|-id=377 bgcolor=#d6d6d6
| 560377 ||  || — || September 15, 2012 || Kitt Peak || Spacewatch ||  || align=right | 3.0 km || 
|-id=378 bgcolor=#d6d6d6
| 560378 ||  || — || March 25, 2015 || Haleakala || Pan-STARRS ||  || align=right | 2.2 km || 
|-id=379 bgcolor=#d6d6d6
| 560379 ||  || — || January 20, 2009 || Mount Lemmon || Mount Lemmon Survey ||  || align=right | 2.2 km || 
|-id=380 bgcolor=#d6d6d6
| 560380 ||  || — || January 31, 2009 || Mount Lemmon || Mount Lemmon Survey ||  || align=right | 2.2 km || 
|-id=381 bgcolor=#d6d6d6
| 560381 ||  || — || February 22, 2009 || Kitt Peak || Spacewatch ||  || align=right | 3.1 km || 
|-id=382 bgcolor=#d6d6d6
| 560382 ||  || — || January 5, 2014 || Haleakala || Pan-STARRS ||  || align=right | 3.1 km || 
|-id=383 bgcolor=#d6d6d6
| 560383 ||  || — || January 23, 2015 || Haleakala || Pan-STARRS ||  || align=right | 2.2 km || 
|-id=384 bgcolor=#d6d6d6
| 560384 ||  || — || March 25, 2015 || Haleakala || Pan-STARRS ||  || align=right | 2.4 km || 
|-id=385 bgcolor=#d6d6d6
| 560385 ||  || — || January 24, 2014 || Haleakala || Pan-STARRS ||  || align=right | 2.6 km || 
|-id=386 bgcolor=#d6d6d6
| 560386 ||  || — || February 3, 2009 || Kitt Peak || Spacewatch ||  || align=right | 2.0 km || 
|-id=387 bgcolor=#d6d6d6
| 560387 ||  || — || March 1, 2009 || Kitt Peak || Spacewatch ||  || align=right | 2.4 km || 
|-id=388 bgcolor=#d6d6d6
| 560388 Normafa ||  ||  || October 21, 2012 || Piszkesteto || K. Sárneczky, G. Hodosán ||  || align=right | 3.0 km || 
|-id=389 bgcolor=#d6d6d6
| 560389 ||  || — || April 22, 1998 || Kitt Peak || Spacewatch ||  || align=right | 2.3 km || 
|-id=390 bgcolor=#d6d6d6
| 560390 ||  || — || October 20, 2007 || Mount Lemmon || Mount Lemmon Survey ||  || align=right | 2.7 km || 
|-id=391 bgcolor=#d6d6d6
| 560391 ||  || — || October 2, 2006 || Catalina || CSS ||  || align=right | 3.0 km || 
|-id=392 bgcolor=#d6d6d6
| 560392 ||  || — || December 23, 2013 || Mount Lemmon || Mount Lemmon Survey ||  || align=right | 3.2 km || 
|-id=393 bgcolor=#d6d6d6
| 560393 ||  || — || January 31, 2009 || Mount Lemmon || Mount Lemmon Survey ||  || align=right | 2.4 km || 
|-id=394 bgcolor=#d6d6d6
| 560394 ||  || — || March 25, 2015 || Haleakala || Pan-STARRS ||  || align=right | 2.6 km || 
|-id=395 bgcolor=#d6d6d6
| 560395 ||  || — || March 25, 2015 || Haleakala || Pan-STARRS ||  || align=right | 2.4 km || 
|-id=396 bgcolor=#d6d6d6
| 560396 ||  || — || April 22, 2004 || Kitt Peak || Spacewatch ||  || align=right | 2.4 km || 
|-id=397 bgcolor=#d6d6d6
| 560397 ||  || — || December 30, 2013 || Mount Lemmon || Mount Lemmon Survey ||  || align=right | 3.0 km || 
|-id=398 bgcolor=#d6d6d6
| 560398 ||  || — || March 23, 2003 || Apache Point || SDSS Collaboration ||  || align=right | 3.0 km || 
|-id=399 bgcolor=#d6d6d6
| 560399 ||  || — || March 25, 2015 || Haleakala || Pan-STARRS ||  || align=right | 2.8 km || 
|-id=400 bgcolor=#d6d6d6
| 560400 ||  || — || July 9, 2005 || Kitt Peak || Spacewatch ||  || align=right | 2.9 km || 
|}

560401–560500 

|-bgcolor=#d6d6d6
| 560401 ||  || — || January 2, 2014 || Kitt Peak || Spacewatch ||  || align=right | 2.8 km || 
|-id=402 bgcolor=#d6d6d6
| 560402 ||  || — || March 25, 2015 || Haleakala || Pan-STARRS ||  || align=right | 2.5 km || 
|-id=403 bgcolor=#d6d6d6
| 560403 ||  || — || December 24, 2013 || Mount Lemmon || Mount Lemmon Survey ||  || align=right | 3.1 km || 
|-id=404 bgcolor=#d6d6d6
| 560404 ||  || — || March 25, 2015 || Haleakala || Pan-STARRS ||  || align=right | 2.6 km || 
|-id=405 bgcolor=#d6d6d6
| 560405 ||  || — || April 13, 2004 || Kitt Peak || Spacewatch ||  || align=right | 3.2 km || 
|-id=406 bgcolor=#d6d6d6
| 560406 ||  || — || July 21, 2006 || Mount Lemmon || Mount Lemmon Survey ||  || align=right | 3.1 km || 
|-id=407 bgcolor=#d6d6d6
| 560407 ||  || — || December 31, 2008 || Mount Lemmon || Mount Lemmon Survey ||  || align=right | 2.5 km || 
|-id=408 bgcolor=#d6d6d6
| 560408 ||  || — || April 19, 2009 || Mount Lemmon || Mount Lemmon Survey ||  || align=right | 3.4 km || 
|-id=409 bgcolor=#d6d6d6
| 560409 ||  || — || July 30, 2005 || Palomar || NEAT ||  || align=right | 3.4 km || 
|-id=410 bgcolor=#fefefe
| 560410 ||  || — || January 11, 2008 || Kitt Peak || Spacewatch ||  || align=right data-sort-value="0.57" | 570 m || 
|-id=411 bgcolor=#d6d6d6
| 560411 ||  || — || November 27, 2013 || Haleakala || Pan-STARRS ||  || align=right | 2.9 km || 
|-id=412 bgcolor=#d6d6d6
| 560412 ||  || — || February 19, 2010 || Kitt Peak || Spacewatch ||  || align=right | 3.9 km || 
|-id=413 bgcolor=#d6d6d6
| 560413 ||  || — || January 31, 2015 || Haleakala || Pan-STARRS ||  || align=right | 2.8 km || 
|-id=414 bgcolor=#C2E0FF
| 560414 ||  || — || March 24, 2015 || Haleakala || Pan-STARRS || SDO || align=right | 176 km || 
|-id=415 bgcolor=#d6d6d6
| 560415 ||  || — || February 13, 2010 || Mount Lemmon || Mount Lemmon Survey || EOS || align=right | 1.5 km || 
|-id=416 bgcolor=#d6d6d6
| 560416 ||  || — || April 30, 2011 || Kitt Peak || Spacewatch ||  || align=right | 2.6 km || 
|-id=417 bgcolor=#d6d6d6
| 560417 ||  || — || November 24, 2008 || Mount Lemmon || Mount Lemmon Survey ||  || align=right | 1.8 km || 
|-id=418 bgcolor=#d6d6d6
| 560418 ||  || — || February 20, 2009 || Mount Lemmon || Mount Lemmon Survey ||  || align=right | 3.0 km || 
|-id=419 bgcolor=#d6d6d6
| 560419 ||  || — || June 28, 2011 || Mount Lemmon || Mount Lemmon Survey ||  || align=right | 3.6 km || 
|-id=420 bgcolor=#d6d6d6
| 560420 ||  || — || March 16, 2015 || Haleakala || Pan-STARRS ||  || align=right | 2.8 km || 
|-id=421 bgcolor=#fefefe
| 560421 ||  || — || January 29, 2015 || Haleakala || Pan-STARRS || H || align=right data-sort-value="0.62" | 620 m || 
|-id=422 bgcolor=#d6d6d6
| 560422 ||  || — || February 27, 2015 || Mount Lemmon || Mount Lemmon Survey ||  || align=right | 2.7 km || 
|-id=423 bgcolor=#d6d6d6
| 560423 ||  || — || October 21, 2012 || Haleakala || Pan-STARRS ||  || align=right | 2.7 km || 
|-id=424 bgcolor=#d6d6d6
| 560424 ||  || — || March 21, 2009 || Kitt Peak || Mount Lemmon Survey ||  || align=right | 2.8 km || 
|-id=425 bgcolor=#d6d6d6
| 560425 ||  || — || August 26, 2011 || Kitt Peak || Spacewatch ||  || align=right | 2.5 km || 
|-id=426 bgcolor=#d6d6d6
| 560426 ||  || — || October 21, 2012 || Mount Lemmon || Pan-STARRS ||  || align=right | 2.3 km || 
|-id=427 bgcolor=#d6d6d6
| 560427 ||  || — || March 17, 2015 || Haleakala || Pan-STARRS ||  || align=right | 2.3 km || 
|-id=428 bgcolor=#d6d6d6
| 560428 ||  || — || August 27, 2011 || Haleakala || Pan-STARRS ||  || align=right | 2.4 km || 
|-id=429 bgcolor=#d6d6d6
| 560429 ||  || — || February 24, 2014 || Haleakala || Pan-STARRS || 7:4 || align=right | 3.2 km || 
|-id=430 bgcolor=#d6d6d6
| 560430 ||  || — || September 18, 2007 || Kitt Peak || Spacewatch ||  || align=right | 2.6 km || 
|-id=431 bgcolor=#d6d6d6
| 560431 ||  || — || November 12, 2013 || Mount Lemmon || Mount Lemmon Survey ||  || align=right | 2.9 km || 
|-id=432 bgcolor=#d6d6d6
| 560432 ||  || — || December 31, 2008 || Bergisch Gladbach || W. Bickel ||  || align=right | 2.7 km || 
|-id=433 bgcolor=#E9E9E9
| 560433 ||  || — || September 30, 2003 || Kitt Peak || Spacewatch ||  || align=right | 2.4 km || 
|-id=434 bgcolor=#d6d6d6
| 560434 ||  || — || February 20, 2015 || Haleakala || Pan-STARRS ||  || align=right | 1.9 km || 
|-id=435 bgcolor=#d6d6d6
| 560435 ||  || — || August 21, 2001 || Haleakala || AMOS ||  || align=right | 2.9 km || 
|-id=436 bgcolor=#d6d6d6
| 560436 ||  || — || August 12, 2012 || Kitt Peak || Spacewatch ||  || align=right | 2.5 km || 
|-id=437 bgcolor=#d6d6d6
| 560437 ||  || — || October 17, 2012 || Mount Lemmon || Mount Lemmon Survey ||  || align=right | 2.5 km || 
|-id=438 bgcolor=#d6d6d6
| 560438 ||  || — || March 18, 2015 || Haleakala || Pan-STARRS ||  || align=right | 3.0 km || 
|-id=439 bgcolor=#d6d6d6
| 560439 ||  || — || February 16, 2015 || Haleakala || Pan-STARRS ||  || align=right | 3.1 km || 
|-id=440 bgcolor=#d6d6d6
| 560440 ||  || — || May 27, 1998 || Kitt Peak || Spacewatch ||  || align=right | 3.7 km || 
|-id=441 bgcolor=#d6d6d6
| 560441 ||  || — || October 31, 2007 || Mount Lemmon || Mount Lemmon Survey ||  || align=right | 2.4 km || 
|-id=442 bgcolor=#d6d6d6
| 560442 ||  || — || November 10, 2013 || Kitt Peak || Spacewatch ||  || align=right | 2.6 km || 
|-id=443 bgcolor=#d6d6d6
| 560443 ||  || — || February 4, 2009 || Kitt Peak || Spacewatch ||  || align=right | 2.5 km || 
|-id=444 bgcolor=#d6d6d6
| 560444 ||  || — || October 13, 2007 || Dauban || F. Kugel ||  || align=right | 2.9 km || 
|-id=445 bgcolor=#d6d6d6
| 560445 ||  || — || February 20, 2015 || Haleakala || Pan-STARRS ||  || align=right | 2.6 km || 
|-id=446 bgcolor=#d6d6d6
| 560446 ||  || — || November 27, 2013 || Haleakala || Pan-STARRS ||  || align=right | 2.9 km || 
|-id=447 bgcolor=#d6d6d6
| 560447 ||  || — || January 26, 2015 || Haleakala || Pan-STARRS ||  || align=right | 2.3 km || 
|-id=448 bgcolor=#d6d6d6
| 560448 ||  || — || January 26, 2015 || Haleakala || Pan-STARRS ||  || align=right | 2.5 km || 
|-id=449 bgcolor=#d6d6d6
| 560449 ||  || — || November 28, 2013 || Mount Lemmon || Mount Lemmon Survey ||  || align=right | 2.2 km || 
|-id=450 bgcolor=#d6d6d6
| 560450 ||  || — || November 4, 2007 || Kitt Peak || Spacewatch ||  || align=right | 2.3 km || 
|-id=451 bgcolor=#d6d6d6
| 560451 ||  || — || May 4, 2005 || Mount Lemmon || Mount Lemmon Survey ||  || align=right | 2.0 km || 
|-id=452 bgcolor=#d6d6d6
| 560452 ||  || — || October 25, 2013 || Kitt Peak || Spacewatch ||  || align=right | 2.0 km || 
|-id=453 bgcolor=#d6d6d6
| 560453 ||  || — || November 9, 2007 || Mount Lemmon || Mount Lemmon Survey ||  || align=right | 2.7 km || 
|-id=454 bgcolor=#d6d6d6
| 560454 ||  || — || September 24, 2012 || Mount Lemmon || Mount Lemmon Survey ||  || align=right | 2.7 km || 
|-id=455 bgcolor=#d6d6d6
| 560455 ||  || — || August 10, 2007 || Kitt Peak || Spacewatch ||  || align=right | 2.7 km || 
|-id=456 bgcolor=#d6d6d6
| 560456 ||  || — || September 23, 2007 || Altschwendt || W. Ries ||  || align=right | 2.7 km || 
|-id=457 bgcolor=#d6d6d6
| 560457 ||  || — || September 24, 2012 || Mount Lemmon || Mount Lemmon Survey ||  || align=right | 2.4 km || 
|-id=458 bgcolor=#d6d6d6
| 560458 ||  || — || November 26, 2013 || Haleakala || Pan-STARRS ||  || align=right | 1.9 km || 
|-id=459 bgcolor=#d6d6d6
| 560459 ||  || — || September 12, 2001 || Kitt Peak || L. H. Wasserman, E. L. Ryan ||  || align=right | 2.4 km || 
|-id=460 bgcolor=#d6d6d6
| 560460 ||  || — || November 2, 2013 || Kitt Peak || Spacewatch ||  || align=right | 2.0 km || 
|-id=461 bgcolor=#d6d6d6
| 560461 ||  || — || October 12, 2007 || Mount Lemmon || Mount Lemmon Survey ||  || align=right | 2.4 km || 
|-id=462 bgcolor=#d6d6d6
| 560462 ||  || — || November 18, 2007 || Mount Lemmon || Mount Lemmon Survey ||  || align=right | 2.8 km || 
|-id=463 bgcolor=#d6d6d6
| 560463 ||  || — || October 3, 2013 || Kitt Peak || Spacewatch ||  || align=right | 2.3 km || 
|-id=464 bgcolor=#fefefe
| 560464 ||  || — || November 6, 2013 || Mount Lemmon || Mount Lemmon Survey ||  || align=right data-sort-value="0.64" | 640 m || 
|-id=465 bgcolor=#d6d6d6
| 560465 ||  || — || November 18, 2007 || Mount Lemmon || Mount Lemmon Survey ||  || align=right | 2.6 km || 
|-id=466 bgcolor=#d6d6d6
| 560466 ||  || — || March 7, 2003 || Kitt Peak || Spacewatch ||  || align=right | 3.3 km || 
|-id=467 bgcolor=#d6d6d6
| 560467 ||  || — || October 13, 2006 || Calvin-Rehoboth || L. A. Molnar || ELF || align=right | 3.7 km || 
|-id=468 bgcolor=#d6d6d6
| 560468 ||  || — || October 11, 2012 || Haleakala || Pan-STARRS ||  || align=right | 2.2 km || 
|-id=469 bgcolor=#d6d6d6
| 560469 ||  || — || January 25, 2015 || Haleakala || Pan-STARRS || 7:4 || align=right | 3.7 km || 
|-id=470 bgcolor=#C2FFFF
| 560470 ||  || — || January 8, 2013 || Mount Lemmon || Mount Lemmon Survey || L4 || align=right | 11 km || 
|-id=471 bgcolor=#d6d6d6
| 560471 ||  || — || September 19, 2011 || Mount Lemmon || Mount Lemmon Survey ||  || align=right | 2.6 km || 
|-id=472 bgcolor=#d6d6d6
| 560472 ||  || — || March 22, 2015 || Mount Lemmon || Mount Lemmon Survey ||  || align=right | 2.3 km || 
|-id=473 bgcolor=#d6d6d6
| 560473 ||  || — || February 13, 2008 || Mount Lemmon || Mount Lemmon Survey ||  || align=right | 2.4 km || 
|-id=474 bgcolor=#d6d6d6
| 560474 ||  || — || April 7, 2010 || Kitt Peak || Spacewatch ||  || align=right | 2.9 km || 
|-id=475 bgcolor=#d6d6d6
| 560475 ||  || — || March 31, 2009 || Mount Lemmon || Mount Lemmon Survey ||  || align=right | 2.9 km || 
|-id=476 bgcolor=#d6d6d6
| 560476 ||  || — || March 29, 2015 || Haleakala || Pan-STARRS ||  || align=right | 2.9 km || 
|-id=477 bgcolor=#d6d6d6
| 560477 ||  || — || January 25, 2015 || Haleakala || Pan-STARRS ||  || align=right | 2.7 km || 
|-id=478 bgcolor=#d6d6d6
| 560478 ||  || — || March 21, 2015 || Haleakala || Pan-STARRS ||  || align=right | 2.0 km || 
|-id=479 bgcolor=#d6d6d6
| 560479 ||  || — || February 4, 2009 || Kitt Peak || Spacewatch ||  || align=right | 2.2 km || 
|-id=480 bgcolor=#d6d6d6
| 560480 ||  || — || March 25, 2015 || Haleakala || Pan-STARRS ||  || align=right | 2.6 km || 
|-id=481 bgcolor=#d6d6d6
| 560481 ||  || — || January 23, 2015 || Haleakala || Pan-STARRS ||  || align=right | 2.4 km || 
|-id=482 bgcolor=#d6d6d6
| 560482 ||  || — || February 28, 2014 || Haleakala || Pan-STARRS ||  || align=right | 1.9 km || 
|-id=483 bgcolor=#d6d6d6
| 560483 ||  || — || December 30, 2007 || Mount Lemmon || Mount Lemmon Survey || 7:4 || align=right | 3.3 km || 
|-id=484 bgcolor=#d6d6d6
| 560484 ||  || — || August 28, 2005 || Kitt Peak || Spacewatch ||  || align=right | 1.9 km || 
|-id=485 bgcolor=#d6d6d6
| 560485 ||  || — || July 25, 2017 || Haleakala || Pan-STARRS ||  || align=right | 1.9 km || 
|-id=486 bgcolor=#d6d6d6
| 560486 ||  || — || November 8, 2007 || Kitt Peak || Spacewatch ||  || align=right | 2.7 km || 
|-id=487 bgcolor=#d6d6d6
| 560487 ||  || — || March 18, 2015 || Haleakala || Pan-STARRS ||  || align=right | 2.8 km || 
|-id=488 bgcolor=#d6d6d6
| 560488 ||  || — || October 17, 2012 || Haleakala || Pan-STARRS ||  || align=right | 2.3 km || 
|-id=489 bgcolor=#d6d6d6
| 560489 ||  || — || March 27, 2015 || Haleakala || Pan-STARRS ||  || align=right | 2.5 km || 
|-id=490 bgcolor=#d6d6d6
| 560490 ||  || — || March 28, 2015 || Haleakala || Pan-STARRS ||  || align=right | 2.5 km || 
|-id=491 bgcolor=#E9E9E9
| 560491 ||  || — || March 25, 2015 || Haleakala || Pan-STARRS ||  || align=right | 1.0 km || 
|-id=492 bgcolor=#d6d6d6
| 560492 ||  || — || November 9, 2013 || Haleakala || Pan-STARRS ||  || align=right | 3.2 km || 
|-id=493 bgcolor=#d6d6d6
| 560493 ||  || — || December 30, 2013 || Mount Lemmon || Mount Lemmon Survey ||  || align=right | 2.8 km || 
|-id=494 bgcolor=#d6d6d6
| 560494 ||  || — || August 10, 2005 || Siding Spring || SSS ||  || align=right | 4.4 km || 
|-id=495 bgcolor=#d6d6d6
| 560495 ||  || — || March 24, 2015 || Haleakala || Pan-STARRS ||  || align=right | 2.2 km || 
|-id=496 bgcolor=#d6d6d6
| 560496 ||  || — || January 1, 2014 || Kitt Peak || Spacewatch ||  || align=right | 3.2 km || 
|-id=497 bgcolor=#d6d6d6
| 560497 ||  || — || December 31, 2008 || Kitt Peak || Spacewatch ||  || align=right | 2.7 km || 
|-id=498 bgcolor=#d6d6d6
| 560498 ||  || — || June 19, 2001 || Palomar || NEAT ||  || align=right | 3.8 km || 
|-id=499 bgcolor=#d6d6d6
| 560499 ||  || — || December 31, 2007 || Kitt Peak || Spacewatch || 7:4 || align=right | 4.2 km || 
|-id=500 bgcolor=#d6d6d6
| 560500 ||  || — || August 16, 2012 || Siding Spring || SSS ||  || align=right | 3.0 km || 
|}

560501–560600 

|-bgcolor=#d6d6d6
| 560501 ||  || — || January 3, 2014 || Mount Lemmon || Mount Lemmon Survey ||  || align=right | 2.6 km || 
|-id=502 bgcolor=#d6d6d6
| 560502 ||  || — || November 27, 2013 || Haleakala || Pan-STARRS ||  || align=right | 2.4 km || 
|-id=503 bgcolor=#d6d6d6
| 560503 ||  || — || November 6, 2012 || Mount Lemmon || Mount Lemmon Survey ||  || align=right | 2.9 km || 
|-id=504 bgcolor=#d6d6d6
| 560504 ||  || — || November 1, 2007 || Kitt Peak || Spacewatch ||  || align=right | 2.9 km || 
|-id=505 bgcolor=#d6d6d6
| 560505 ||  || — || October 19, 2012 || Haleakala || Pan-STARRS ||  || align=right | 2.9 km || 
|-id=506 bgcolor=#d6d6d6
| 560506 ||  || — || May 21, 2005 || Mount Lemmon || Mount Lemmon Survey ||  || align=right | 2.7 km || 
|-id=507 bgcolor=#d6d6d6
| 560507 ||  || — || March 16, 2015 || Haleakala || Pan-STARRS ||  || align=right | 2.1 km || 
|-id=508 bgcolor=#d6d6d6
| 560508 ||  || — || October 11, 2012 || Haleakala || Pan-STARRS ||  || align=right | 2.5 km || 
|-id=509 bgcolor=#d6d6d6
| 560509 ||  || — || October 12, 2007 || Kitt Peak || Spacewatch ||  || align=right | 2.2 km || 
|-id=510 bgcolor=#d6d6d6
| 560510 ||  || — || November 14, 2006 || Kitt Peak || Spacewatch ||  || align=right | 2.5 km || 
|-id=511 bgcolor=#d6d6d6
| 560511 ||  || — || July 29, 2005 || Palomar || NEAT ||  || align=right | 2.9 km || 
|-id=512 bgcolor=#d6d6d6
| 560512 ||  || — || May 21, 2005 || Mount Lemmon || Mount Lemmon Survey ||  || align=right | 2.8 km || 
|-id=513 bgcolor=#E9E9E9
| 560513 ||  || — || April 12, 2015 || Cerro Paranal || M. Altmann, T. Prusti ||  || align=right data-sort-value="0.68" | 680 m || 
|-id=514 bgcolor=#d6d6d6
| 560514 ||  || — || June 16, 2010 || Kitt Peak || Spacewatch ||  || align=right | 4.0 km || 
|-id=515 bgcolor=#d6d6d6
| 560515 ||  || — || February 7, 2008 || Mount Lemmon || Mount Lemmon Survey ||  || align=right | 2.8 km || 
|-id=516 bgcolor=#d6d6d6
| 560516 ||  || — || October 4, 2006 || Mount Lemmon || Mount Lemmon Survey ||  || align=right | 3.6 km || 
|-id=517 bgcolor=#d6d6d6
| 560517 ||  || — || December 4, 2012 || Mount Lemmon || Mount Lemmon Survey ||  || align=right | 2.9 km || 
|-id=518 bgcolor=#d6d6d6
| 560518 ||  || — || July 4, 2005 || Kitt Peak || NEAT ||  || align=right | 3.4 km || 
|-id=519 bgcolor=#d6d6d6
| 560519 ||  || — || March 16, 2009 || Mount Lemmon || Mount Lemmon Survey ||  || align=right | 2.2 km || 
|-id=520 bgcolor=#d6d6d6
| 560520 ||  || — || October 10, 2007 || Mount Lemmon || Mount Lemmon Survey ||  || align=right | 2.7 km || 
|-id=521 bgcolor=#d6d6d6
| 560521 ||  || — || January 21, 2014 || Mount Lemmon || Mount Lemmon Survey ||  || align=right | 2.2 km || 
|-id=522 bgcolor=#d6d6d6
| 560522 ||  || — || October 20, 2012 || Piszkesteto || A. Király ||  || align=right | 2.9 km || 
|-id=523 bgcolor=#d6d6d6
| 560523 ||  || — || February 23, 2015 || Haleakala || Pan-STARRS ||  || align=right | 2.6 km || 
|-id=524 bgcolor=#d6d6d6
| 560524 ||  || — || October 8, 2012 || Mount Lemmon || Mount Lemmon Survey ||  || align=right | 2.3 km || 
|-id=525 bgcolor=#d6d6d6
| 560525 ||  || — || March 29, 2009 || Mount Lemmon || Mount Lemmon Survey ||  || align=right | 2.2 km || 
|-id=526 bgcolor=#E9E9E9
| 560526 ||  || — || February 13, 2010 || Mount Lemmon || Mount Lemmon Survey ||  || align=right | 1.5 km || 
|-id=527 bgcolor=#d6d6d6
| 560527 ||  || — || January 10, 2008 || Mount Lemmon || Mount Lemmon Survey ||  || align=right | 2.8 km || 
|-id=528 bgcolor=#d6d6d6
| 560528 ||  || — || January 25, 2015 || Haleakala || Pan-STARRS ||  || align=right | 2.5 km || 
|-id=529 bgcolor=#d6d6d6
| 560529 ||  || — || March 25, 2015 || Haleakala || Pan-STARRS ||  || align=right | 2.8 km || 
|-id=530 bgcolor=#d6d6d6
| 560530 ||  || — || April 15, 2015 || Haleakala || Pan-STARRS ||  || align=right | 4.0 km || 
|-id=531 bgcolor=#d6d6d6
| 560531 ||  || — || November 12, 2001 || Apache Point || SDSS Collaboration ||  || align=right | 3.0 km || 
|-id=532 bgcolor=#d6d6d6
| 560532 ||  || — || March 25, 2015 || Haleakala || Pan-STARRS ||  || align=right | 2.3 km || 
|-id=533 bgcolor=#d6d6d6
| 560533 ||  || — || May 19, 2010 || Mount Lemmon || Mount Lemmon Survey ||  || align=right | 3.3 km || 
|-id=534 bgcolor=#d6d6d6
| 560534 ||  || — || March 22, 2015 || Haleakala || Pan-STARRS ||  || align=right | 2.8 km || 
|-id=535 bgcolor=#d6d6d6
| 560535 ||  || — || March 22, 2015 || Haleakala || Pan-STARRS ||  || align=right | 2.6 km || 
|-id=536 bgcolor=#d6d6d6
| 560536 ||  || — || February 16, 2015 || Haleakala || Pan-STARRS ||  || align=right | 2.5 km || 
|-id=537 bgcolor=#d6d6d6
| 560537 ||  || — || March 22, 2015 || Haleakala || Pan-STARRS ||  || align=right | 2.0 km || 
|-id=538 bgcolor=#d6d6d6
| 560538 ||  || — || July 15, 2005 || Mount Lemmon || Mount Lemmon Survey ||  || align=right | 2.8 km || 
|-id=539 bgcolor=#d6d6d6
| 560539 ||  || — || February 20, 2009 || Mount Lemmon || Mount Lemmon Survey ||  || align=right | 2.4 km || 
|-id=540 bgcolor=#d6d6d6
| 560540 ||  || — || October 8, 2012 || Haleakala || Pan-STARRS ||  || align=right | 2.7 km || 
|-id=541 bgcolor=#d6d6d6
| 560541 ||  || — || April 10, 2015 || Mount Lemmon || Mount Lemmon Survey ||  || align=right | 2.4 km || 
|-id=542 bgcolor=#d6d6d6
| 560542 ||  || — || October 20, 2012 || Haleakala || Pan-STARRS ||  || align=right | 2.9 km || 
|-id=543 bgcolor=#d6d6d6
| 560543 ||  || — || November 13, 2012 || Mount Lemmon || Mount Lemmon Survey ||  || align=right | 3.3 km || 
|-id=544 bgcolor=#d6d6d6
| 560544 ||  || — || December 28, 2013 || Kitt Peak || Spacewatch ||  || align=right | 2.3 km || 
|-id=545 bgcolor=#d6d6d6
| 560545 ||  || — || November 11, 2001 || Apache Point || SDSS Collaboration ||  || align=right | 2.8 km || 
|-id=546 bgcolor=#d6d6d6
| 560546 ||  || — || February 16, 2015 || Haleakala || Pan-STARRS ||  || align=right | 2.9 km || 
|-id=547 bgcolor=#d6d6d6
| 560547 ||  || — || December 16, 2007 || Kitt Peak || Spacewatch ||  || align=right | 3.3 km || 
|-id=548 bgcolor=#d6d6d6
| 560548 ||  || — || March 25, 2015 || Haleakala || Pan-STARRS ||  || align=right | 2.0 km || 
|-id=549 bgcolor=#d6d6d6
| 560549 ||  || — || January 30, 2009 || Mount Lemmon || Mount Lemmon Survey ||  || align=right | 2.8 km || 
|-id=550 bgcolor=#d6d6d6
| 560550 ||  || — || July 27, 2011 || Haleakala || Pan-STARRS ||  || align=right | 2.3 km || 
|-id=551 bgcolor=#d6d6d6
| 560551 ||  || — || May 4, 2010 || Kitt Peak || Spacewatch ||  || align=right | 2.8 km || 
|-id=552 bgcolor=#C2E0FF
| 560552 ||  || — || April 13, 2015 || Cerro Tololo || S. S. Sheppard, C. Trujillo || other TNO || align=right | 234 km || 
|-id=553 bgcolor=#d6d6d6
| 560553 ||  || — || January 20, 2015 || Haleakala || Pan-STARRS ||  || align=right | 3.1 km || 
|-id=554 bgcolor=#d6d6d6
| 560554 ||  || — || July 5, 2005 || Mount Lemmon || Mount Lemmon Survey ||  || align=right | 2.5 km || 
|-id=555 bgcolor=#d6d6d6
| 560555 ||  || — || October 8, 2008 || Mount Lemmon || Mount Lemmon Survey ||  || align=right | 3.4 km || 
|-id=556 bgcolor=#d6d6d6
| 560556 ||  || — || April 13, 2015 || Haleakala || Pan-STARRS ||  || align=right | 2.3 km || 
|-id=557 bgcolor=#d6d6d6
| 560557 ||  || — || March 1, 2009 || Palomar || Spacewatch ||  || align=right | 2.4 km || 
|-id=558 bgcolor=#d6d6d6
| 560558 ||  || — || January 22, 2015 || Haleakala || Pan-STARRS ||  || align=right | 2.4 km || 
|-id=559 bgcolor=#d6d6d6
| 560559 ||  || — || January 20, 2015 || Haleakala || Pan-STARRS ||  || align=right | 2.2 km || 
|-id=560 bgcolor=#d6d6d6
| 560560 ||  || — || August 31, 2011 || Haleakala || Pan-STARRS || 7:4 || align=right | 3.6 km || 
|-id=561 bgcolor=#d6d6d6
| 560561 ||  || — || November 20, 2007 || Kitt Peak || Spacewatch ||  || align=right | 2.7 km || 
|-id=562 bgcolor=#d6d6d6
| 560562 ||  || — || November 1, 2013 || Mount Lemmon || Mount Lemmon Survey ||  || align=right | 3.5 km || 
|-id=563 bgcolor=#FFC2E0
| 560563 ||  || — || April 18, 2015 || Cerro Tololo-DECam || R. L. Allen, D. James || APO +1km || align=right data-sort-value="0.80" | 800 m || 
|-id=564 bgcolor=#d6d6d6
| 560564 ||  || — || January 31, 2015 || Haleakala || Pan-STARRS ||  || align=right | 2.0 km || 
|-id=565 bgcolor=#d6d6d6
| 560565 ||  || — || November 5, 2007 || Mount Lemmon || Mount Lemmon Survey ||  || align=right | 3.1 km || 
|-id=566 bgcolor=#d6d6d6
| 560566 ||  || — || March 21, 2015 || Haleakala || Pan-STARRS ||  || align=right | 3.1 km || 
|-id=567 bgcolor=#d6d6d6
| 560567 ||  || — || October 21, 2012 || Mount Lemmon || Mount Lemmon Survey ||  || align=right | 3.0 km || 
|-id=568 bgcolor=#d6d6d6
| 560568 ||  || — || April 10, 2015 || Kitt Peak || Spacewatch ||  || align=right | 2.6 km || 
|-id=569 bgcolor=#d6d6d6
| 560569 ||  || — || December 25, 2014 || Haleakala || Pan-STARRS ||  || align=right | 3.6 km || 
|-id=570 bgcolor=#E9E9E9
| 560570 ||  || — || September 14, 2013 || Haleakala || Pan-STARRS ||  || align=right | 2.5 km || 
|-id=571 bgcolor=#d6d6d6
| 560571 ||  || — || October 26, 2013 || Mount Lemmon || Mount Lemmon Survey ||  || align=right | 3.5 km || 
|-id=572 bgcolor=#d6d6d6
| 560572 ||  || — || November 1, 2013 || Catalina || CSS ||  || align=right | 3.3 km || 
|-id=573 bgcolor=#d6d6d6
| 560573 ||  || — || March 25, 2010 || Kitt Peak || Spacewatch ||  || align=right | 2.8 km || 
|-id=574 bgcolor=#d6d6d6
| 560574 ||  || — || May 4, 2010 || Kitt Peak || Spacewatch ||  || align=right | 2.3 km || 
|-id=575 bgcolor=#d6d6d6
| 560575 ||  || — || March 21, 2015 || Mount Lemmon || Mount Lemmon Survey ||  || align=right | 2.8 km || 
|-id=576 bgcolor=#d6d6d6
| 560576 ||  || — || November 19, 1995 || Kitt Peak || Spacewatch ||  || align=right | 3.0 km || 
|-id=577 bgcolor=#d6d6d6
| 560577 ||  || — || March 21, 2015 || Haleakala || Pan-STARRS ||  || align=right | 2.2 km || 
|-id=578 bgcolor=#d6d6d6
| 560578 ||  || — || October 21, 2006 || Mount Lemmon || Mount Lemmon Survey ||  || align=right | 2.8 km || 
|-id=579 bgcolor=#d6d6d6
| 560579 ||  || — || October 21, 2006 || Mount Lemmon || Mount Lemmon Survey ||  || align=right | 2.6 km || 
|-id=580 bgcolor=#d6d6d6
| 560580 ||  || — || March 16, 2015 || Mount Lemmon || Mount Lemmon Survey ||  || align=right | 2.5 km || 
|-id=581 bgcolor=#d6d6d6
| 560581 ||  || — || October 23, 2006 || Kitt Peak || Spacewatch ||  || align=right | 2.7 km || 
|-id=582 bgcolor=#d6d6d6
| 560582 ||  || — || October 18, 2012 || Haleakala || Pan-STARRS ||  || align=right | 2.7 km || 
|-id=583 bgcolor=#d6d6d6
| 560583 ||  || — || August 18, 2006 || Palomar || NEAT ||  || align=right | 2.3 km || 
|-id=584 bgcolor=#d6d6d6
| 560584 ||  || — || November 5, 2007 || Mount Lemmon || Mount Lemmon Survey ||  || align=right | 1.7 km || 
|-id=585 bgcolor=#d6d6d6
| 560585 ||  || — || February 20, 2009 || Kitt Peak || Spacewatch ||  || align=right | 2.3 km || 
|-id=586 bgcolor=#d6d6d6
| 560586 ||  || — || March 21, 2015 || Haleakala || Pan-STARRS ||  || align=right | 2.4 km || 
|-id=587 bgcolor=#d6d6d6
| 560587 ||  || — || January 1, 2008 || Kitt Peak || Spacewatch ||  || align=right | 2.6 km || 
|-id=588 bgcolor=#d6d6d6
| 560588 ||  || — || August 21, 2006 || Kitt Peak || Spacewatch ||  || align=right | 3.0 km || 
|-id=589 bgcolor=#d6d6d6
| 560589 ||  || — || November 7, 2007 || Kitt Peak || Spacewatch ||  || align=right | 3.0 km || 
|-id=590 bgcolor=#d6d6d6
| 560590 ||  || — || March 17, 2015 || Haleakala || Pan-STARRS ||  || align=right | 2.4 km || 
|-id=591 bgcolor=#d6d6d6
| 560591 ||  || — || November 14, 2012 || Kitt Peak || Spacewatch ||  || align=right | 2.8 km || 
|-id=592 bgcolor=#d6d6d6
| 560592 ||  || — || October 21, 2012 || Mount Lemmon || Mount Lemmon Survey ||  || align=right | 3.3 km || 
|-id=593 bgcolor=#d6d6d6
| 560593 ||  || — || December 8, 2012 || Mount Lemmon || Mount Lemmon Survey ||  || align=right | 2.9 km || 
|-id=594 bgcolor=#d6d6d6
| 560594 ||  || — || November 16, 1995 || Kitt Peak || Spacewatch ||  || align=right | 2.8 km || 
|-id=595 bgcolor=#d6d6d6
| 560595 ||  || — || October 23, 2006 || Mount Lemmon || Mount Lemmon Survey ||  || align=right | 2.8 km || 
|-id=596 bgcolor=#d6d6d6
| 560596 ||  || — || January 15, 2008 || Kitt Peak || Spacewatch ||  || align=right | 2.9 km || 
|-id=597 bgcolor=#d6d6d6
| 560597 ||  || — || January 30, 2015 || Haleakala || Pan-STARRS ||  || align=right | 2.5 km || 
|-id=598 bgcolor=#d6d6d6
| 560598 ||  || — || May 23, 2004 || Kitt Peak || Spacewatch ||  || align=right | 2.7 km || 
|-id=599 bgcolor=#fefefe
| 560599 ||  || — || December 21, 2003 || Kitt Peak || Spacewatch ||  || align=right | 1.0 km || 
|-id=600 bgcolor=#d6d6d6
| 560600 ||  || — || October 20, 2012 || Haleakala || Pan-STARRS ||  || align=right | 2.5 km || 
|}

560601–560700 

|-bgcolor=#d6d6d6
| 560601 ||  || — || March 27, 2015 || Haleakala || Pan-STARRS ||  || align=right | 2.1 km || 
|-id=602 bgcolor=#d6d6d6
| 560602 ||  || — || November 9, 2007 || Kitt Peak || Spacewatch ||  || align=right | 2.7 km || 
|-id=603 bgcolor=#d6d6d6
| 560603 ||  || — || November 8, 2013 || Mount Lemmon || Mount Lemmon Survey ||  || align=right | 2.9 km || 
|-id=604 bgcolor=#d6d6d6
| 560604 ||  || — || November 8, 2007 || Kitt Peak || Spacewatch ||  || align=right | 2.3 km || 
|-id=605 bgcolor=#d6d6d6
| 560605 ||  || — || June 15, 2010 || Mount Lemmon || Mount Lemmon Survey ||  || align=right | 3.6 km || 
|-id=606 bgcolor=#d6d6d6
| 560606 ||  || — || December 2, 2012 || Mount Lemmon || Mount Lemmon Survey ||  || align=right | 2.9 km || 
|-id=607 bgcolor=#d6d6d6
| 560607 ||  || — || March 27, 2015 || Haleakala || Pan-STARRS ||  || align=right | 2.9 km || 
|-id=608 bgcolor=#E9E9E9
| 560608 ||  || — || May 23, 2006 || Kitt Peak || Spacewatch ||  || align=right | 1.6 km || 
|-id=609 bgcolor=#d6d6d6
| 560609 ||  || — || February 16, 2015 || Haleakala || Pan-STARRS ||  || align=right | 2.9 km || 
|-id=610 bgcolor=#d6d6d6
| 560610 ||  || — || February 16, 2015 || Haleakala || Pan-STARRS ||  || align=right | 2.1 km || 
|-id=611 bgcolor=#d6d6d6
| 560611 ||  || — || October 8, 2012 || Haleakala || Pan-STARRS ||  || align=right | 2.9 km || 
|-id=612 bgcolor=#d6d6d6
| 560612 ||  || — || March 21, 2015 || Haleakala || Pan-STARRS ||  || align=right | 2.5 km || 
|-id=613 bgcolor=#d6d6d6
| 560613 ||  || — || January 3, 2009 || Mount Lemmon || Mount Lemmon Survey ||  || align=right | 2.4 km || 
|-id=614 bgcolor=#d6d6d6
| 560614 ||  || — || January 10, 2008 || Kitt Peak || Spacewatch || 7:4 || align=right | 3.5 km || 
|-id=615 bgcolor=#d6d6d6
| 560615 ||  || — || November 4, 2007 || Kitt Peak || Spacewatch ||  || align=right | 2.7 km || 
|-id=616 bgcolor=#d6d6d6
| 560616 ||  || — || December 29, 2008 || Mount Lemmon || Mount Lemmon Survey ||  || align=right | 2.7 km || 
|-id=617 bgcolor=#d6d6d6
| 560617 ||  || — || September 17, 2012 || Mount Lemmon || Mount Lemmon Survey ||  || align=right | 2.6 km || 
|-id=618 bgcolor=#fefefe
| 560618 ||  || — || October 26, 2013 || Catalina || CSS ||  || align=right data-sort-value="0.70" | 700 m || 
|-id=619 bgcolor=#fefefe
| 560619 ||  || — || September 19, 2003 || Kitt Peak || Spacewatch ||  || align=right data-sort-value="0.76" | 760 m || 
|-id=620 bgcolor=#d6d6d6
| 560620 ||  || — || May 5, 1997 || Kitt Peak || Spacewatch ||  || align=right | 3.7 km || 
|-id=621 bgcolor=#fefefe
| 560621 ||  || — || November 14, 2010 || Kitt Peak || Spacewatch ||  || align=right data-sort-value="0.56" | 560 m || 
|-id=622 bgcolor=#d6d6d6
| 560622 ||  || — || April 23, 2015 || Haleakala || Pan-STARRS ||  || align=right | 2.4 km || 
|-id=623 bgcolor=#d6d6d6
| 560623 ||  || — || August 30, 2005 || Kitt Peak || Spacewatch ||  || align=right | 2.2 km || 
|-id=624 bgcolor=#fefefe
| 560624 ||  || — || August 14, 2012 || Haleakala || Pan-STARRS ||  || align=right data-sort-value="0.78" | 780 m || 
|-id=625 bgcolor=#d6d6d6
| 560625 ||  || — || March 23, 2015 || Kitt Peak || Spacewatch ||  || align=right | 2.3 km || 
|-id=626 bgcolor=#d6d6d6
| 560626 ||  || — || December 7, 2012 || Nogales || M. Schwartz, P. R. Holvorcem ||  || align=right | 2.9 km || 
|-id=627 bgcolor=#E9E9E9
| 560627 ||  || — || April 2, 2006 || Kitt Peak || Spacewatch ||  || align=right | 1.7 km || 
|-id=628 bgcolor=#d6d6d6
| 560628 ||  || — || September 17, 2006 || Kitt Peak || Spacewatch ||  || align=right | 3.2 km || 
|-id=629 bgcolor=#d6d6d6
| 560629 ||  || — || November 12, 2012 || Mount Lemmon || Mount Lemmon Survey ||  || align=right | 2.3 km || 
|-id=630 bgcolor=#d6d6d6
| 560630 ||  || — || February 19, 2009 || Kitt Peak || Spacewatch ||  || align=right | 2.5 km || 
|-id=631 bgcolor=#d6d6d6
| 560631 ||  || — || August 30, 2005 || Kitt Peak || Spacewatch ||  || align=right | 2.6 km || 
|-id=632 bgcolor=#d6d6d6
| 560632 ||  || — || January 4, 2014 || Mount Lemmon || Mount Lemmon Survey ||  || align=right | 2.2 km || 
|-id=633 bgcolor=#E9E9E9
| 560633 ||  || — || April 14, 2015 || Mount Lemmon || Mount Lemmon Survey ||  || align=right | 1.3 km || 
|-id=634 bgcolor=#d6d6d6
| 560634 ||  || — || May 19, 2010 || Mount Lemmon || Mount Lemmon Survey ||  || align=right | 1.8 km || 
|-id=635 bgcolor=#E9E9E9
| 560635 ||  || — || November 1, 2008 || Mount Lemmon || Mount Lemmon Survey ||  || align=right | 1.7 km || 
|-id=636 bgcolor=#d6d6d6
| 560636 ||  || — || October 8, 2007 || Mount Lemmon || Mount Lemmon Survey ||  || align=right | 2.7 km || 
|-id=637 bgcolor=#d6d6d6
| 560637 ||  || — || August 27, 2011 || Piszkesteto || K. Sárneczky ||  || align=right | 2.5 km || 
|-id=638 bgcolor=#d6d6d6
| 560638 ||  || — || October 11, 2012 || Haleakala || Pan-STARRS ||  || align=right | 2.3 km || 
|-id=639 bgcolor=#d6d6d6
| 560639 ||  || — || March 17, 2009 || Kitt Peak || Spacewatch ||  || align=right | 2.0 km || 
|-id=640 bgcolor=#d6d6d6
| 560640 ||  || — || February 22, 2009 || Kitt Peak || Spacewatch ||  || align=right | 2.6 km || 
|-id=641 bgcolor=#d6d6d6
| 560641 ||  || — || October 8, 2012 || Mount Lemmon || Mount Lemmon Survey ||  || align=right | 3.1 km || 
|-id=642 bgcolor=#d6d6d6
| 560642 ||  || — || August 8, 2005 || Siding Spring || SSS ||  || align=right | 2.8 km || 
|-id=643 bgcolor=#d6d6d6
| 560643 ||  || — || December 29, 2013 || Haleakala || Pan-STARRS ||  || align=right | 2.0 km || 
|-id=644 bgcolor=#fefefe
| 560644 ||  || — || September 22, 2003 || Anderson Mesa || LONEOS ||  || align=right data-sort-value="0.57" | 570 m || 
|-id=645 bgcolor=#d6d6d6
| 560645 ||  || — || March 19, 2015 || Haleakala || Pan-STARRS ||  || align=right | 2.0 km || 
|-id=646 bgcolor=#E9E9E9
| 560646 ||  || — || January 1, 2014 || Haleakala || Pan-STARRS || MRX || align=right data-sort-value="0.95" | 950 m || 
|-id=647 bgcolor=#fefefe
| 560647 ||  || — || July 30, 2005 || Palomar || NEAT ||  || align=right data-sort-value="0.54" | 540 m || 
|-id=648 bgcolor=#d6d6d6
| 560648 ||  || — || February 6, 2014 || Mount Lemmon || Mount Lemmon Survey ||  || align=right | 2.9 km || 
|-id=649 bgcolor=#d6d6d6
| 560649 ||  || — || November 5, 2012 || Kitt Peak || Spacewatch ||  || align=right | 3.0 km || 
|-id=650 bgcolor=#d6d6d6
| 560650 ||  || — || February 24, 2015 || Mount Lemmon || Pan-STARRS ||  || align=right | 2.4 km || 
|-id=651 bgcolor=#d6d6d6
| 560651 ||  || — || December 25, 2013 || Kitt Peak || Spacewatch ||  || align=right | 2.7 km || 
|-id=652 bgcolor=#d6d6d6
| 560652 ||  || — || February 23, 2015 || Haleakala || Pan-STARRS ||  || align=right | 1.9 km || 
|-id=653 bgcolor=#d6d6d6
| 560653 ||  || — || November 8, 2007 || Mount Lemmon || Mount Lemmon Survey ||  || align=right | 2.9 km || 
|-id=654 bgcolor=#d6d6d6
| 560654 ||  || — || August 6, 2011 || Haleakala || Pan-STARRS ||  || align=right | 2.8 km || 
|-id=655 bgcolor=#d6d6d6
| 560655 ||  || — || January 31, 2008 || Mount Lemmon || Mount Lemmon Survey ||  || align=right | 3.1 km || 
|-id=656 bgcolor=#d6d6d6
| 560656 ||  || — || January 1, 2014 || Haleakala || Pan-STARRS ||  || align=right | 2.5 km || 
|-id=657 bgcolor=#d6d6d6
| 560657 ||  || — || April 13, 2015 || Haleakala || Pan-STARRS ||  || align=right | 3.0 km || 
|-id=658 bgcolor=#d6d6d6
| 560658 ||  || — || January 26, 2014 || Haleakala || Pan-STARRS ||  || align=right | 2.2 km || 
|-id=659 bgcolor=#d6d6d6
| 560659 ||  || — || December 30, 2007 || Mount Lemmon || Mount Lemmon Survey ||  || align=right | 3.1 km || 
|-id=660 bgcolor=#d6d6d6
| 560660 ||  || — || March 28, 2015 || Haleakala || Pan-STARRS ||  || align=right | 2.1 km || 
|-id=661 bgcolor=#d6d6d6
| 560661 ||  || — || April 2, 2009 || Mount Lemmon || Mount Lemmon Survey ||  || align=right | 2.8 km || 
|-id=662 bgcolor=#d6d6d6
| 560662 ||  || — || March 15, 2009 || Mount Lemmon || Mount Lemmon Survey ||  || align=right | 2.4 km || 
|-id=663 bgcolor=#d6d6d6
| 560663 ||  || — || January 24, 2014 || Haleakala || Pan-STARRS ||  || align=right | 2.3 km || 
|-id=664 bgcolor=#d6d6d6
| 560664 ||  || — || January 12, 2008 || Kitt Peak || Spacewatch ||  || align=right | 3.1 km || 
|-id=665 bgcolor=#d6d6d6
| 560665 ||  || — || March 21, 2015 || Haleakala || Pan-STARRS ||  || align=right | 2.4 km || 
|-id=666 bgcolor=#d6d6d6
| 560666 ||  || — || April 1, 2003 || Apache Point || SDSS Collaboration ||  || align=right | 4.0 km || 
|-id=667 bgcolor=#d6d6d6
| 560667 ||  || — || February 23, 2015 || Haleakala || Pan-STARRS ||  || align=right | 2.5 km || 
|-id=668 bgcolor=#d6d6d6
| 560668 ||  || — || April 13, 2015 || Haleakala || Pan-STARRS ||  || align=right | 1.9 km || 
|-id=669 bgcolor=#d6d6d6
| 560669 ||  || — || January 9, 2014 || Mount Lemmon || Mount Lemmon Survey ||  || align=right | 2.7 km || 
|-id=670 bgcolor=#E9E9E9
| 560670 ||  || — || October 7, 2008 || Mount Lemmon || Mount Lemmon Survey ||  || align=right | 1.6 km || 
|-id=671 bgcolor=#d6d6d6
| 560671 ||  || — || January 11, 2008 || Kitt Peak || Spacewatch ||  || align=right | 2.3 km || 
|-id=672 bgcolor=#d6d6d6
| 560672 ||  || — || September 26, 2006 || Mount Lemmon || Mount Lemmon Survey ||  || align=right | 2.6 km || 
|-id=673 bgcolor=#fefefe
| 560673 ||  || — || July 27, 2005 || Palomar || NEAT ||  || align=right data-sort-value="0.61" | 610 m || 
|-id=674 bgcolor=#fefefe
| 560674 ||  || — || April 13, 2008 || Kitt Peak || Spacewatch || V || align=right data-sort-value="0.86" | 860 m || 
|-id=675 bgcolor=#d6d6d6
| 560675 ||  || — || November 13, 2007 || Kitt Peak || Spacewatch ||  || align=right | 1.9 km || 
|-id=676 bgcolor=#d6d6d6
| 560676 ||  || — || November 13, 2012 || Kitt Peak || Spacewatch ||  || align=right | 2.6 km || 
|-id=677 bgcolor=#E9E9E9
| 560677 ||  || — || November 9, 2013 || Haleakala || Pan-STARRS ||  || align=right data-sort-value="0.68" | 680 m || 
|-id=678 bgcolor=#d6d6d6
| 560678 ||  || — || May 8, 2010 || Mount Lemmon || Mount Lemmon Survey ||  || align=right | 2.3 km || 
|-id=679 bgcolor=#E9E9E9
| 560679 ||  || — || September 24, 2008 || Mount Lemmon || Mount Lemmon Survey ||  || align=right | 1.5 km || 
|-id=680 bgcolor=#d6d6d6
| 560680 ||  || — || November 16, 1999 || Kitt Peak || Spacewatch || 7:4 || align=right | 4.2 km || 
|-id=681 bgcolor=#fefefe
| 560681 ||  || — || November 26, 2013 || Haleakala || Pan-STARRS ||  || align=right data-sort-value="0.58" | 580 m || 
|-id=682 bgcolor=#fefefe
| 560682 ||  || — || April 12, 2011 || Mount Lemmon || Mount Lemmon Survey ||  || align=right data-sort-value="0.68" | 680 m || 
|-id=683 bgcolor=#d6d6d6
| 560683 ||  || — || January 24, 2014 || Haleakala || Pan-STARRS ||  || align=right | 2.1 km || 
|-id=684 bgcolor=#d6d6d6
| 560684 ||  || — || March 2, 2009 || Kitt Peak || Spacewatch ||  || align=right | 2.7 km || 
|-id=685 bgcolor=#d6d6d6
| 560685 ||  || — || November 20, 2006 || Kitt Peak || Spacewatch || THM || align=right | 2.6 km || 
|-id=686 bgcolor=#E9E9E9
| 560686 ||  || — || January 6, 2006 || Mount Lemmon || Mount Lemmon Survey ||  || align=right data-sort-value="0.98" | 980 m || 
|-id=687 bgcolor=#d6d6d6
| 560687 ||  || — || October 11, 2006 || Palomar || NEAT ||  || align=right | 3.1 km || 
|-id=688 bgcolor=#d6d6d6
| 560688 ||  || — || March 26, 2015 || Mount Lemmon || Mount Lemmon Survey ||  || align=right | 3.1 km || 
|-id=689 bgcolor=#d6d6d6
| 560689 ||  || — || March 18, 2015 || Haleakala || Pan-STARRS ||  || align=right | 2.1 km || 
|-id=690 bgcolor=#d6d6d6
| 560690 ||  || — || November 7, 2012 || Haleakala || Pan-STARRS ||  || align=right | 2.1 km || 
|-id=691 bgcolor=#d6d6d6
| 560691 ||  || — || October 19, 2006 || Kitt Peak || Spacewatch ||  || align=right | 2.6 km || 
|-id=692 bgcolor=#d6d6d6
| 560692 ||  || — || August 31, 2005 || Palomar || NEAT ||  || align=right | 3.3 km || 
|-id=693 bgcolor=#E9E9E9
| 560693 ||  || — || April 24, 2015 || Haleakala || Pan-STARRS ||  || align=right data-sort-value="0.98" | 980 m || 
|-id=694 bgcolor=#fefefe
| 560694 ||  || — || April 3, 2008 || Kitt Peak || Mount Lemmon Survey ||  || align=right data-sort-value="0.64" | 640 m || 
|-id=695 bgcolor=#d6d6d6
| 560695 ||  || — || October 30, 2007 || Kitt Peak || Spacewatch ||  || align=right | 3.1 km || 
|-id=696 bgcolor=#d6d6d6
| 560696 ||  || — || January 28, 2015 || Haleakala || Pan-STARRS ||  || align=right | 2.7 km || 
|-id=697 bgcolor=#d6d6d6
| 560697 ||  || — || April 13, 2004 || Palomar || NEAT ||  || align=right | 3.4 km || 
|-id=698 bgcolor=#d6d6d6
| 560698 ||  || — || September 24, 2012 || Kitt Peak || Spacewatch ||  || align=right | 3.6 km || 
|-id=699 bgcolor=#d6d6d6
| 560699 ||  || — || November 18, 2007 || Mount Lemmon || Mount Lemmon Survey ||  || align=right | 2.5 km || 
|-id=700 bgcolor=#d6d6d6
| 560700 ||  || — || October 9, 2007 || Kitt Peak || Spacewatch ||  || align=right | 2.9 km || 
|}

560701–560800 

|-bgcolor=#d6d6d6
| 560701 ||  || — || January 6, 2008 || Mount Lemmon || Mauna Kea Obs. ||  || align=right | 2.8 km || 
|-id=702 bgcolor=#d6d6d6
| 560702 ||  || — || October 23, 2012 || Kitt Peak || Spacewatch ||  || align=right | 2.7 km || 
|-id=703 bgcolor=#d6d6d6
| 560703 ||  || — || January 24, 2014 || Haleakala || Pan-STARRS ||  || align=right | 2.1 km || 
|-id=704 bgcolor=#d6d6d6
| 560704 ||  || — || September 18, 2001 || Apache Point || SDSS Collaboration ||  || align=right | 2.2 km || 
|-id=705 bgcolor=#d6d6d6
| 560705 ||  || — || April 25, 2015 || Haleakala || Pan-STARRS ||  || align=right | 2.1 km || 
|-id=706 bgcolor=#d6d6d6
| 560706 ||  || — || January 11, 2014 || Kitt Peak || Spacewatch ||  || align=right | 2.3 km || 
|-id=707 bgcolor=#d6d6d6
| 560707 ||  || — || April 30, 2015 || Mount Lemmon || Mount Lemmon Survey || Tj (2.99) || align=right | 3.1 km || 
|-id=708 bgcolor=#d6d6d6
| 560708 ||  || — || July 14, 2016 || Haleakala || Pan-STARRS ||  || align=right | 2.2 km || 
|-id=709 bgcolor=#d6d6d6
| 560709 ||  || — || April 23, 2015 || Haleakala || Pan-STARRS ||  || align=right | 2.4 km || 
|-id=710 bgcolor=#d6d6d6
| 560710 ||  || — || April 20, 2015 || Haleakala || Pan-STARRS ||  || align=right | 2.3 km || 
|-id=711 bgcolor=#E9E9E9
| 560711 ||  || — || April 23, 2015 || Haleakala || Pan-STARRS ||  || align=right | 1.6 km || 
|-id=712 bgcolor=#d6d6d6
| 560712 ||  || — || April 18, 2015 || Mount Lemmon || Mount Lemmon Survey ||  || align=right | 2.2 km || 
|-id=713 bgcolor=#C2FFFF
| 560713 ||  || — || April 18, 2015 || Mount Lemmon || Mount Lemmon Survey || L4 || align=right | 7.3 km || 
|-id=714 bgcolor=#fefefe
| 560714 ||  || — || April 10, 2002 || Socorro || LINEAR ||  || align=right data-sort-value="0.71" | 710 m || 
|-id=715 bgcolor=#E9E9E9
| 560715 ||  || — || May 15, 2015 || Haleakala || Pan-STARRS ||  || align=right | 1.0 km || 
|-id=716 bgcolor=#d6d6d6
| 560716 ||  || — || January 28, 2015 || Haleakala || Pan-STARRS ||  || align=right | 2.9 km || 
|-id=717 bgcolor=#fefefe
| 560717 ||  || — || December 14, 2006 || Kitt Peak || Spacewatch ||  || align=right data-sort-value="0.68" | 680 m || 
|-id=718 bgcolor=#E9E9E9
| 560718 ||  || — || May 14, 2015 || Cerro Paranal || M. Altmann, T. Prusti ||  || align=right | 1.7 km || 
|-id=719 bgcolor=#d6d6d6
| 560719 ||  || — || May 14, 2015 || Haleakala || Pan-STARRS ||  || align=right | 2.8 km || 
|-id=720 bgcolor=#d6d6d6
| 560720 ||  || — || October 15, 2007 || Mount Lemmon || Mount Lemmon Survey ||  || align=right | 2.9 km || 
|-id=721 bgcolor=#d6d6d6
| 560721 ||  || — || January 28, 2015 || Haleakala || Pan-STARRS ||  || align=right | 2.7 km || 
|-id=722 bgcolor=#d6d6d6
| 560722 ||  || — || October 22, 2012 || Haleakala || Pan-STARRS ||  || align=right | 2.8 km || 
|-id=723 bgcolor=#fefefe
| 560723 ||  || — || January 4, 2011 || Mount Lemmon || Mount Lemmon Survey ||  || align=right data-sort-value="0.79" | 790 m || 
|-id=724 bgcolor=#d6d6d6
| 560724 ||  || — || December 31, 2013 || Haleakala || Pan-STARRS ||  || align=right | 2.7 km || 
|-id=725 bgcolor=#d6d6d6
| 560725 ||  || — || October 31, 2013 || Kitt Peak || Spacewatch ||  || align=right | 2.3 km || 
|-id=726 bgcolor=#d6d6d6
| 560726 ||  || — || August 26, 2005 || Palomar || NEAT ||  || align=right | 3.7 km || 
|-id=727 bgcolor=#d6d6d6
| 560727 ||  || — || September 25, 2011 || Haleakala || Pan-STARRS ||  || align=right | 2.6 km || 
|-id=728 bgcolor=#d6d6d6
| 560728 ||  || — || October 11, 2006 || Palomar || NEAT ||  || align=right | 3.1 km || 
|-id=729 bgcolor=#d6d6d6
| 560729 ||  || — || September 30, 2006 || Kitt Peak || Spacewatch ||  || align=right | 2.6 km || 
|-id=730 bgcolor=#fefefe
| 560730 ||  || — || October 24, 2003 || Kitt Peak || Spacewatch ||  || align=right data-sort-value="0.71" | 710 m || 
|-id=731 bgcolor=#fefefe
| 560731 ||  || — || February 26, 2004 || Kitt Peak || M. W. Buie, D. E. Trilling ||  || align=right data-sort-value="0.48" | 480 m || 
|-id=732 bgcolor=#fefefe
| 560732 ||  || — || July 25, 2006 || Palomar || NEAT ||  || align=right data-sort-value="0.63" | 630 m || 
|-id=733 bgcolor=#fefefe
| 560733 ||  || — || January 10, 2007 || Mount Lemmon || Mount Lemmon Survey ||  || align=right data-sort-value="0.90" | 900 m || 
|-id=734 bgcolor=#fefefe
| 560734 ||  || — || November 13, 2006 || Kitt Peak || Spacewatch ||  || align=right data-sort-value="0.87" | 870 m || 
|-id=735 bgcolor=#d6d6d6
| 560735 ||  || — || October 31, 2006 || Mount Lemmon || Mount Lemmon Survey ||  || align=right | 2.9 km || 
|-id=736 bgcolor=#E9E9E9
| 560736 ||  || — || April 28, 2015 || Cerro Paranal || M. Altmann, T. Prusti ||  || align=right data-sort-value="0.96" | 960 m || 
|-id=737 bgcolor=#d6d6d6
| 560737 ||  || — || May 10, 2015 || Mount Lemmon || Mount Lemmon Survey ||  || align=right | 2.4 km || 
|-id=738 bgcolor=#d6d6d6
| 560738 ||  || — || March 30, 2015 || Haleakala || Pan-STARRS ||  || align=right | 2.6 km || 
|-id=739 bgcolor=#d6d6d6
| 560739 ||  || — || August 30, 2005 || Palomar || NEAT ||  || align=right | 2.6 km || 
|-id=740 bgcolor=#fefefe
| 560740 ||  || — || October 16, 2006 || Catalina || CSS ||  || align=right data-sort-value="0.72" | 720 m || 
|-id=741 bgcolor=#fefefe
| 560741 ||  || — || October 8, 2012 || Kitt Peak || Spacewatch ||  || align=right data-sort-value="0.54" | 540 m || 
|-id=742 bgcolor=#d6d6d6
| 560742 ||  || — || May 20, 2015 || Haleakala || Pan-STARRS ||  || align=right | 2.4 km || 
|-id=743 bgcolor=#fefefe
| 560743 ||  || — || May 20, 2015 || Haleakala || Pan-STARRS ||  || align=right data-sort-value="0.45" | 450 m || 
|-id=744 bgcolor=#fefefe
| 560744 ||  || — || May 20, 2015 || Haleakala || Pan-STARRS ||  || align=right data-sort-value="0.52" | 520 m || 
|-id=745 bgcolor=#d6d6d6
| 560745 ||  || — || April 22, 2009 || Mount Lemmon || Mount Lemmon Survey ||  || align=right | 2.7 km || 
|-id=746 bgcolor=#fefefe
| 560746 ||  || — || April 4, 2011 || Kitt Peak || Spacewatch ||  || align=right data-sort-value="0.69" | 690 m || 
|-id=747 bgcolor=#fefefe
| 560747 ||  || — || May 20, 2015 || Haleakala || Pan-STARRS ||  || align=right data-sort-value="0.80" | 800 m || 
|-id=748 bgcolor=#d6d6d6
| 560748 ||  || — || April 30, 2009 || Kitt Peak || Spacewatch ||  || align=right | 2.4 km || 
|-id=749 bgcolor=#fefefe
| 560749 ||  || — || January 10, 2008 || Kitt Peak || Spacewatch ||  || align=right data-sort-value="0.55" | 550 m || 
|-id=750 bgcolor=#FA8072
| 560750 ||  || — || October 29, 2003 || Kitt Peak || Spacewatch ||  || align=right data-sort-value="0.62" | 620 m || 
|-id=751 bgcolor=#fefefe
| 560751 ||  || — || November 11, 2013 || Kitt Peak || Spacewatch ||  || align=right data-sort-value="0.43" | 430 m || 
|-id=752 bgcolor=#d6d6d6
| 560752 ||  || — || February 9, 2008 || Kitt Peak || Spacewatch || 7:4 || align=right | 4.5 km || 
|-id=753 bgcolor=#d6d6d6
| 560753 ||  || — || September 25, 2011 || Haleakala || Pan-STARRS ||  || align=right | 2.3 km || 
|-id=754 bgcolor=#d6d6d6
| 560754 ||  || — || April 25, 2015 || Haleakala || Pan-STARRS ||  || align=right | 1.9 km || 
|-id=755 bgcolor=#fefefe
| 560755 ||  || — || January 30, 2011 || Mount Lemmon || Mount Lemmon Survey ||  || align=right data-sort-value="0.56" | 560 m || 
|-id=756 bgcolor=#E9E9E9
| 560756 ||  || — || April 28, 2011 || Kitt Peak || Spacewatch ||  || align=right data-sort-value="0.86" | 860 m || 
|-id=757 bgcolor=#d6d6d6
| 560757 ||  || — || May 11, 2015 || Mount Lemmon || Mount Lemmon Survey ||  || align=right | 2.4 km || 
|-id=758 bgcolor=#E9E9E9
| 560758 ||  || — || April 25, 2015 || Haleakala || Pan-STARRS ||  || align=right | 1.9 km || 
|-id=759 bgcolor=#d6d6d6
| 560759 ||  || — || March 30, 2015 || Haleakala || Pan-STARRS ||  || align=right | 2.9 km || 
|-id=760 bgcolor=#d6d6d6
| 560760 ||  || — || May 21, 2015 || Haleakala || Pan-STARRS ||  || align=right | 1.6 km || 
|-id=761 bgcolor=#d6d6d6
| 560761 ||  || — || February 22, 2014 || Mount Lemmon || Mount Lemmon Survey ||  || align=right | 2.6 km || 
|-id=762 bgcolor=#d6d6d6
| 560762 ||  || — || April 14, 2015 || Kitt Peak || Spacewatch || 7:4 || align=right | 3.6 km || 
|-id=763 bgcolor=#d6d6d6
| 560763 ||  || — || April 24, 2003 || Kitt Peak || Spacewatch ||  || align=right | 2.7 km || 
|-id=764 bgcolor=#d6d6d6
| 560764 ||  || — || May 21, 2015 || Haleakala || Pan-STARRS ||  || align=right | 2.5 km || 
|-id=765 bgcolor=#d6d6d6
| 560765 ||  || — || March 30, 2015 || Haleakala || Pan-STARRS ||  || align=right | 2.5 km || 
|-id=766 bgcolor=#d6d6d6
| 560766 ||  || — || April 1, 2003 || Apache Point || SDSS Collaboration ||  || align=right | 3.1 km || 
|-id=767 bgcolor=#fefefe
| 560767 ||  || — || September 28, 2009 || Mount Lemmon || Mount Lemmon Survey ||  || align=right data-sort-value="0.64" | 640 m || 
|-id=768 bgcolor=#fefefe
| 560768 ||  || — || March 30, 2015 || Haleakala || Pan-STARRS ||  || align=right data-sort-value="0.60" | 600 m || 
|-id=769 bgcolor=#fefefe
| 560769 ||  || — || May 11, 2008 || Kitt Peak || Spacewatch ||  || align=right data-sort-value="0.49" | 490 m || 
|-id=770 bgcolor=#fefefe
| 560770 ||  || — || April 1, 2008 || Mount Lemmon || Mount Lemmon Survey ||  || align=right data-sort-value="0.64" | 640 m || 
|-id=771 bgcolor=#d6d6d6
| 560771 ||  || — || April 18, 2015 || Haleakala || Pan-STARRS ||  || align=right | 2.3 km || 
|-id=772 bgcolor=#d6d6d6
| 560772 ||  || — || July 6, 2005 || Kitt Peak || Spacewatch ||  || align=right | 2.7 km || 
|-id=773 bgcolor=#fefefe
| 560773 ||  || — || August 26, 2012 || Haleakala || Pan-STARRS || MAS || align=right data-sort-value="0.54" | 540 m || 
|-id=774 bgcolor=#fefefe
| 560774 ||  || — || June 23, 2009 || Mount Lemmon || Mount Lemmon Survey ||  || align=right data-sort-value="0.72" | 720 m || 
|-id=775 bgcolor=#fefefe
| 560775 ||  || — || September 23, 2008 || Kitt Peak || Spacewatch ||  || align=right data-sort-value="0.61" | 610 m || 
|-id=776 bgcolor=#E9E9E9
| 560776 ||  || — || April 30, 2011 || Mount Lemmon || Mount Lemmon Survey ||  || align=right data-sort-value="0.73" | 730 m || 
|-id=777 bgcolor=#d6d6d6
| 560777 ||  || — || May 19, 2015 || Mount Lemmon || Mount Lemmon Survey ||  || align=right | 2.9 km || 
|-id=778 bgcolor=#fefefe
| 560778 ||  || — || April 25, 2015 || Haleakala || Pan-STARRS ||  || align=right data-sort-value="0.50" | 500 m || 
|-id=779 bgcolor=#d6d6d6
| 560779 ||  || — || April 25, 2015 || Haleakala || Pan-STARRS ||  || align=right | 2.1 km || 
|-id=780 bgcolor=#fefefe
| 560780 ||  || — || June 21, 2009 || Kitt Peak || Spacewatch ||  || align=right data-sort-value="0.49" | 490 m || 
|-id=781 bgcolor=#E9E9E9
| 560781 ||  || — || June 5, 2011 || Kitt Peak || Spacewatch ||  || align=right data-sort-value="0.74" | 740 m || 
|-id=782 bgcolor=#fefefe
| 560782 ||  || — || May 13, 2015 || Mount Lemmon || Mount Lemmon Survey ||  || align=right data-sort-value="0.65" | 650 m || 
|-id=783 bgcolor=#fefefe
| 560783 ||  || — || February 12, 2008 || Kitt Peak || Spacewatch ||  || align=right data-sort-value="0.86" | 860 m || 
|-id=784 bgcolor=#fefefe
| 560784 ||  || — || March 29, 2008 || Catalina || CSS ||  || align=right data-sort-value="0.66" | 660 m || 
|-id=785 bgcolor=#fefefe
| 560785 ||  || — || October 20, 2012 || Haleakala || Pan-STARRS ||  || align=right data-sort-value="0.73" | 730 m || 
|-id=786 bgcolor=#fefefe
| 560786 ||  || — || October 27, 2009 || Kitt Peak || Spacewatch ||  || align=right data-sort-value="0.72" | 720 m || 
|-id=787 bgcolor=#fefefe
| 560787 ||  || — || September 11, 2002 || Haleakala || AMOS ||  || align=right data-sort-value="0.63" | 630 m || 
|-id=788 bgcolor=#fefefe
| 560788 ||  || — || December 8, 2010 || Mount Lemmon || Mount Lemmon Survey ||  || align=right data-sort-value="0.68" | 680 m || 
|-id=789 bgcolor=#E9E9E9
| 560789 ||  || — || March 23, 2006 || Kitt Peak || Spacewatch ||  || align=right | 1.1 km || 
|-id=790 bgcolor=#E9E9E9
| 560790 ||  || — || October 18, 2003 || Kitt Peak || Spacewatch ||  || align=right | 1.3 km || 
|-id=791 bgcolor=#fefefe
| 560791 ||  || — || March 11, 2002 || Palomar || NEAT ||  || align=right data-sort-value="0.74" | 740 m || 
|-id=792 bgcolor=#E9E9E9
| 560792 ||  || — || March 21, 2015 || Haleakala || Pan-STARRS ||  || align=right | 1.2 km || 
|-id=793 bgcolor=#fefefe
| 560793 ||  || — || September 21, 2012 || Mount Lemmon || Mount Lemmon Survey ||  || align=right data-sort-value="0.56" | 560 m || 
|-id=794 bgcolor=#d6d6d6
| 560794 ||  || — || November 23, 2012 || Mount Graham || R. P. Boyle, V. Laugalys ||  || align=right | 2.5 km || 
|-id=795 bgcolor=#d6d6d6
| 560795 ||  || — || May 24, 2015 || Haleakala || Pan-STARRS ||  || align=right | 2.2 km || 
|-id=796 bgcolor=#fefefe
| 560796 ||  || — || August 18, 2006 || Kitt Peak || Spacewatch ||  || align=right data-sort-value="0.58" | 580 m || 
|-id=797 bgcolor=#fefefe
| 560797 ||  || — || December 19, 2004 || Mount Lemmon || Mount Lemmon Survey ||  || align=right data-sort-value="0.57" | 570 m || 
|-id=798 bgcolor=#d6d6d6
| 560798 ||  || — || September 29, 2011 || Mount Lemmon || Mount Lemmon Survey ||  || align=right | 2.4 km || 
|-id=799 bgcolor=#fefefe
| 560799 ||  || — || April 26, 2008 || Mount Lemmon || Mount Lemmon Survey || (2076) || align=right data-sort-value="0.82" | 820 m || 
|-id=800 bgcolor=#d6d6d6
| 560800 ||  || — || January 28, 2014 || Mount Lemmon || Mount Lemmon Survey ||  || align=right | 3.5 km || 
|}

560801–560900 

|-bgcolor=#d6d6d6
| 560801 ||  || — || December 19, 2007 || Mount Lemmon || Mount Lemmon Survey ||  || align=right | 3.5 km || 
|-id=802 bgcolor=#C2FFFF
| 560802 ||  || — || November 27, 2010 || Mount Lemmon || Mount Lemmon Survey || L4 || align=right | 7.9 km || 
|-id=803 bgcolor=#d6d6d6
| 560803 ||  || — || January 25, 2014 || Kitt Peak || Pan-STARRS ||  || align=right | 2.5 km || 
|-id=804 bgcolor=#fefefe
| 560804 ||  || — || October 15, 2012 || Haleakala || Pan-STARRS ||  || align=right data-sort-value="0.74" | 740 m || 
|-id=805 bgcolor=#E9E9E9
| 560805 ||  || — || December 28, 2005 || Mount Lemmon || Mount Lemmon Survey ||  || align=right | 1.3 km || 
|-id=806 bgcolor=#d6d6d6
| 560806 ||  || — || May 21, 2015 || Haleakala || Pan-STARRS ||  || align=right | 2.6 km || 
|-id=807 bgcolor=#fefefe
| 560807 ||  || — || May 25, 2015 || Haleakala || Pan-STARRS ||  || align=right data-sort-value="0.71" | 710 m || 
|-id=808 bgcolor=#E9E9E9
| 560808 ||  || — || March 18, 2015 || Haleakala || Pan-STARRS ||  || align=right | 1.4 km || 
|-id=809 bgcolor=#E9E9E9
| 560809 ||  || — || May 21, 2015 || Haleakala || Pan-STARRS 2 ||  || align=right data-sort-value="0.80" | 800 m || 
|-id=810 bgcolor=#E9E9E9
| 560810 ||  || — || May 21, 2015 || Haleakala || Pan-STARRS ||  || align=right data-sort-value="0.83" | 830 m || 
|-id=811 bgcolor=#E9E9E9
| 560811 ||  || — || October 23, 2012 || Haleakala || Pan-STARRS ||  || align=right | 1.5 km || 
|-id=812 bgcolor=#E9E9E9
| 560812 ||  || — || May 22, 2015 || Haleakala || Pan-STARRS ||  || align=right data-sort-value="0.67" | 670 m || 
|-id=813 bgcolor=#d6d6d6
| 560813 ||  || — || May 25, 2015 || Haleakala || Pan-STARRS ||  || align=right | 1.9 km || 
|-id=814 bgcolor=#fefefe
| 560814 ||  || — || January 31, 2008 || Mount Lemmon || Mount Lemmon Survey ||  || align=right data-sort-value="0.64" | 640 m || 
|-id=815 bgcolor=#fefefe
| 560815 ||  || — || May 24, 2015 || Haleakala || Pan-STARRS ||  || align=right data-sort-value="0.84" | 840 m || 
|-id=816 bgcolor=#fefefe
| 560816 ||  || — || January 13, 2008 || Kitt Peak || Spacewatch ||  || align=right data-sort-value="0.58" | 580 m || 
|-id=817 bgcolor=#fefefe
| 560817 ||  || — || May 21, 2015 || Haleakala || Pan-STARRS ||  || align=right data-sort-value="0.62" | 620 m || 
|-id=818 bgcolor=#fefefe
| 560818 ||  || — || May 22, 2015 || Haleakala || Pan-STARRS ||  || align=right data-sort-value="0.68" | 680 m || 
|-id=819 bgcolor=#E9E9E9
| 560819 ||  || — || May 25, 2015 || Haleakala || Pan-STARRS ||  || align=right data-sort-value="0.92" | 920 m || 
|-id=820 bgcolor=#d6d6d6
| 560820 ||  || — || May 21, 2015 || Kitt Peak || Pan-STARRS ||  || align=right | 1.7 km || 
|-id=821 bgcolor=#E9E9E9
| 560821 ||  || — || October 17, 2012 || Mount Lemmon || Mount Lemmon Survey ||  || align=right | 1.2 km || 
|-id=822 bgcolor=#E9E9E9
| 560822 ||  || — || May 21, 2015 || Haleakala || Pan-STARRS ||  || align=right data-sort-value="0.68" | 680 m || 
|-id=823 bgcolor=#d6d6d6
| 560823 ||  || — || August 20, 2006 || Palomar || NEAT ||  || align=right | 4.5 km || 
|-id=824 bgcolor=#fefefe
| 560824 ||  || — || February 24, 2015 || Haleakala || Pan-STARRS ||  || align=right data-sort-value="0.60" | 600 m || 
|-id=825 bgcolor=#d6d6d6
| 560825 ||  || — || March 24, 2009 || Mount Lemmon || Mount Lemmon Survey ||  || align=right | 2.8 km || 
|-id=826 bgcolor=#d6d6d6
| 560826 ||  || — || May 13, 2009 || Kitt Peak || Spacewatch ||  || align=right | 2.6 km || 
|-id=827 bgcolor=#d6d6d6
| 560827 ||  || — || May 2, 1998 || Kitt Peak || Spacewatch ||  || align=right | 3.4 km || 
|-id=828 bgcolor=#d6d6d6
| 560828 ||  || — || May 4, 2009 || Mount Lemmon || Mount Lemmon Survey ||  || align=right | 3.0 km || 
|-id=829 bgcolor=#d6d6d6
| 560829 ||  || — || October 14, 2010 || Mount Lemmon || Mount Lemmon Survey ||  || align=right | 3.1 km || 
|-id=830 bgcolor=#d6d6d6
| 560830 ||  || — || January 3, 2013 || Mount Lemmon || Mount Lemmon Survey ||  || align=right | 3.2 km || 
|-id=831 bgcolor=#FA8072
| 560831 ||  || — || August 28, 2006 || Anderson Mesa || LONEOS ||  || align=right data-sort-value="0.56" | 560 m || 
|-id=832 bgcolor=#fefefe
| 560832 ||  || — || March 14, 2008 || Mount Lemmon || Mount Lemmon Survey ||  || align=right data-sort-value="0.50" | 500 m || 
|-id=833 bgcolor=#fefefe
| 560833 ||  || — || October 15, 2012 || Kitt Peak || Spacewatch ||  || align=right data-sort-value="0.65" | 650 m || 
|-id=834 bgcolor=#fefefe
| 560834 ||  || — || October 16, 2012 || Kitt Peak || Spacewatch ||  || align=right data-sort-value="0.52" | 520 m || 
|-id=835 bgcolor=#fefefe
| 560835 ||  || — || July 28, 2005 || Palomar || NEAT ||  || align=right data-sort-value="0.79" | 790 m || 
|-id=836 bgcolor=#fefefe
| 560836 ||  || — || June 13, 2015 || Haleakala || Pan-STARRS ||  || align=right data-sort-value="0.58" | 580 m || 
|-id=837 bgcolor=#E9E9E9
| 560837 ||  || — || June 13, 2015 || Haleakala || Pan-STARRS ||  || align=right | 1.1 km || 
|-id=838 bgcolor=#d6d6d6
| 560838 ||  || — || December 29, 2008 || Mount Lemmon || Mount Lemmon Survey ||  || align=right | 3.9 km || 
|-id=839 bgcolor=#E9E9E9
| 560839 ||  || — || June 14, 2015 || Mount Lemmon || Mount Lemmon Survey ||  || align=right | 1.3 km || 
|-id=840 bgcolor=#d6d6d6
| 560840 ||  || — || June 10, 2015 || Haleakala || Pan-STARRS ||  || align=right | 2.4 km || 
|-id=841 bgcolor=#d6d6d6
| 560841 ||  || — || June 15, 2015 || Haleakala || Pan-STARRS ||  || align=right | 2.4 km || 
|-id=842 bgcolor=#E9E9E9
| 560842 ||  || — || June 15, 2015 || Haleakala || Pan-STARRS ||  || align=right data-sort-value="0.92" | 920 m || 
|-id=843 bgcolor=#E9E9E9
| 560843 ||  || — || June 7, 2015 || Haleakala || Pan-STARRS ||  || align=right data-sort-value="0.99" | 990 m || 
|-id=844 bgcolor=#fefefe
| 560844 ||  || — || November 21, 2003 || Kitt Peak || Spacewatch ||  || align=right data-sort-value="0.62" | 620 m || 
|-id=845 bgcolor=#d6d6d6
| 560845 ||  || — || March 11, 2014 || Mount Lemmon || Mount Lemmon Survey || 7:4 || align=right | 2.9 km || 
|-id=846 bgcolor=#fefefe
| 560846 ||  || — || October 18, 2012 || Mount Lemmon || Mount Lemmon Survey ||  || align=right data-sort-value="0.81" | 810 m || 
|-id=847 bgcolor=#fefefe
| 560847 ||  || — || August 13, 2002 || Palomar || NEAT ||  || align=right data-sort-value="0.67" | 670 m || 
|-id=848 bgcolor=#fefefe
| 560848 ||  || — || March 28, 2001 || Kitt Peak || Spacewatch ||  || align=right data-sort-value="0.81" | 810 m || 
|-id=849 bgcolor=#fefefe
| 560849 ||  || — || August 25, 2012 || Kitt Peak || Spacewatch ||  || align=right data-sort-value="0.77" | 770 m || 
|-id=850 bgcolor=#d6d6d6
| 560850 ||  || — || October 21, 2006 || Mount Lemmon || Mount Lemmon Survey ||  || align=right | 2.8 km || 
|-id=851 bgcolor=#d6d6d6
| 560851 ||  || — || November 17, 1999 || Kitt Peak || Spacewatch || 7:4 || align=right | 3.3 km || 
|-id=852 bgcolor=#d6d6d6
| 560852 ||  || — || October 21, 2006 || Mount Lemmon || Mount Lemmon Survey ||  || align=right | 2.6 km || 
|-id=853 bgcolor=#d6d6d6
| 560853 ||  || — || September 28, 2006 || Catalina || CSS ||  || align=right | 3.0 km || 
|-id=854 bgcolor=#fefefe
| 560854 ||  || — || November 17, 2006 || Kitt Peak || Spacewatch ||  || align=right data-sort-value="0.59" | 590 m || 
|-id=855 bgcolor=#fefefe
| 560855 ||  || — || March 22, 2015 || Haleakala || Pan-STARRS ||  || align=right data-sort-value="0.58" | 580 m || 
|-id=856 bgcolor=#d6d6d6
| 560856 ||  || — || May 22, 2015 || Haleakala || Pan-STARRS ||  || align=right | 2.5 km || 
|-id=857 bgcolor=#fefefe
| 560857 ||  || — || February 1, 2008 || Kitt Peak || Spacewatch ||  || align=right data-sort-value="0.72" | 720 m || 
|-id=858 bgcolor=#E9E9E9
| 560858 ||  || — || December 11, 2013 || Haleakala || Pan-STARRS ||  || align=right | 1.2 km || 
|-id=859 bgcolor=#fefefe
| 560859 ||  || — || April 14, 2008 || Kitt Peak || Spacewatch ||  || align=right data-sort-value="0.62" | 620 m || 
|-id=860 bgcolor=#fefefe
| 560860 ||  || — || November 11, 2009 || Mount Lemmon || Mount Lemmon Survey ||  || align=right data-sort-value="0.79" | 790 m || 
|-id=861 bgcolor=#fefefe
| 560861 ||  || — || February 14, 2007 || Mauna Kea || Mauna Kea Obs. ||  || align=right data-sort-value="0.80" | 800 m || 
|-id=862 bgcolor=#fefefe
| 560862 ||  || — || November 10, 2005 || Catalina || CSS ||  || align=right data-sort-value="0.66" | 660 m || 
|-id=863 bgcolor=#fefefe
| 560863 ||  || — || June 17, 2015 || Haleakala || Pan-STARRS ||  || align=right data-sort-value="0.69" | 690 m || 
|-id=864 bgcolor=#E9E9E9
| 560864 ||  || — || June 17, 2015 || Haleakala || Pan-STARRS ||  || align=right | 1.1 km || 
|-id=865 bgcolor=#fefefe
| 560865 ||  || — || May 24, 2011 || Haleakala || Pan-STARRS ||  || align=right data-sort-value="0.73" | 730 m || 
|-id=866 bgcolor=#d6d6d6
| 560866 ||  || — || May 20, 2015 || Haleakala || Pan-STARRS ||  || align=right | 2.4 km || 
|-id=867 bgcolor=#fefefe
| 560867 ||  || — || December 13, 2002 || Haleakala || AMOS ||  || align=right | 1.1 km || 
|-id=868 bgcolor=#d6d6d6
| 560868 ||  || — || August 5, 2005 || Palomar || NEAT ||  || align=right | 3.6 km || 
|-id=869 bgcolor=#fefefe
| 560869 ||  || — || September 26, 2005 || Palomar || NEAT ||  || align=right data-sort-value="0.86" | 860 m || 
|-id=870 bgcolor=#FA8072
| 560870 ||  || — || November 17, 2009 || Mount Lemmon || Mount Lemmon Survey ||  || align=right data-sort-value="0.55" | 550 m || 
|-id=871 bgcolor=#fefefe
| 560871 ||  || — || June 20, 2015 || Haleakala || Pan-STARRS ||  || align=right | 1.3 km || 
|-id=872 bgcolor=#fefefe
| 560872 ||  || — || March 28, 2008 || Kitt Peak || Spacewatch ||  || align=right data-sort-value="0.52" | 520 m || 
|-id=873 bgcolor=#fefefe
| 560873 ||  || — || February 28, 2014 || Haleakala || Pan-STARRS ||  || align=right data-sort-value="0.85" | 850 m || 
|-id=874 bgcolor=#fefefe
| 560874 ||  || — || October 20, 2006 || Kitt Peak || Spacewatch ||  || align=right data-sort-value="0.54" | 540 m || 
|-id=875 bgcolor=#fefefe
| 560875 ||  || — || January 28, 2004 || Kitt Peak || Spacewatch ||  || align=right data-sort-value="0.67" | 670 m || 
|-id=876 bgcolor=#fefefe
| 560876 ||  || — || January 25, 2014 || Haleakala || Pan-STARRS ||  || align=right data-sort-value="0.65" | 650 m || 
|-id=877 bgcolor=#fefefe
| 560877 ||  || — || July 15, 2005 || Kitt Peak || Spacewatch ||  || align=right data-sort-value="0.61" | 610 m || 
|-id=878 bgcolor=#d6d6d6
| 560878 ||  || — || April 22, 2009 || Siding Spring || SSS ||  || align=right | 3.9 km || 
|-id=879 bgcolor=#fefefe
| 560879 ||  || — || September 20, 2012 || Mayhill-ISON || L. Elenin ||  || align=right data-sort-value="0.70" | 700 m || 
|-id=880 bgcolor=#fefefe
| 560880 ||  || — || August 26, 2012 || Kitt Peak || Spacewatch ||  || align=right data-sort-value="0.78" | 780 m || 
|-id=881 bgcolor=#fefefe
| 560881 ||  || — || October 13, 2002 || Kitt Peak || Spacewatch ||  || align=right data-sort-value="0.98" | 980 m || 
|-id=882 bgcolor=#fefefe
| 560882 ||  || — || December 24, 2013 || Mount Lemmon || Mount Lemmon Survey ||  || align=right data-sort-value="0.64" | 640 m || 
|-id=883 bgcolor=#fefefe
| 560883 ||  || — || August 26, 2012 || Haleakala || Pan-STARRS ||  || align=right data-sort-value="0.58" | 580 m || 
|-id=884 bgcolor=#fefefe
| 560884 ||  || — || November 10, 2009 || Kitt Peak || Spacewatch ||  || align=right data-sort-value="0.74" | 740 m || 
|-id=885 bgcolor=#fefefe
| 560885 ||  || — || December 20, 2009 || Kitt Peak || Spacewatch ||  || align=right data-sort-value="0.73" | 730 m || 
|-id=886 bgcolor=#fefefe
| 560886 ||  || — || April 13, 2011 || Haleakala || Pan-STARRS ||  || align=right data-sort-value="0.79" | 790 m || 
|-id=887 bgcolor=#fefefe
| 560887 ||  || — || October 30, 2005 || Kitt Peak || Mount Lemmon Survey ||  || align=right | 1.0 km || 
|-id=888 bgcolor=#d6d6d6
| 560888 ||  || — || May 25, 2015 || Haleakala || Pan-STARRS ||  || align=right | 2.8 km || 
|-id=889 bgcolor=#d6d6d6
| 560889 ||  || — || February 22, 2003 || Klet || J. Tichá, M. Tichý ||  || align=right | 3.6 km || 
|-id=890 bgcolor=#fefefe
| 560890 ||  || — || April 6, 2005 || Mount Lemmon || Mount Lemmon Survey ||  || align=right data-sort-value="0.63" | 630 m || 
|-id=891 bgcolor=#fefefe
| 560891 ||  || — || November 24, 2009 || Kitt Peak || Spacewatch ||  || align=right data-sort-value="0.66" | 660 m || 
|-id=892 bgcolor=#fefefe
| 560892 ||  || — || March 11, 2008 || Kitt Peak || Spacewatch ||  || align=right data-sort-value="0.58" | 580 m || 
|-id=893 bgcolor=#d6d6d6
| 560893 ||  || — || September 17, 2010 || Mount Lemmon || Mount Lemmon Survey ||  || align=right | 2.4 km || 
|-id=894 bgcolor=#fefefe
| 560894 ||  || — || April 30, 2015 || La Palma || La Palma Obs. ||  || align=right data-sort-value="0.70" | 700 m || 
|-id=895 bgcolor=#d6d6d6
| 560895 ||  || — || December 8, 2005 || Kitt Peak || Spacewatch || 7:4 || align=right | 2.8 km || 
|-id=896 bgcolor=#fefefe
| 560896 ||  || — || October 18, 2012 || Mount Lemmon || Mount Lemmon Survey ||  || align=right data-sort-value="0.74" | 740 m || 
|-id=897 bgcolor=#fefefe
| 560897 ||  || — || February 28, 2008 || Mount Lemmon || Mount Lemmon Survey ||  || align=right data-sort-value="0.52" | 520 m || 
|-id=898 bgcolor=#fefefe
| 560898 ||  || — || June 26, 2015 || Haleakala || Pan-STARRS ||  || align=right data-sort-value="0.58" | 580 m || 
|-id=899 bgcolor=#fefefe
| 560899 ||  || — || June 13, 2015 || Haleakala || Pan-STARRS ||  || align=right data-sort-value="0.70" | 700 m || 
|-id=900 bgcolor=#fefefe
| 560900 ||  || — || July 28, 2001 || Anderson Mesa || LONEOS ||  || align=right data-sort-value="0.95" | 950 m || 
|}

560901–561000 

|-bgcolor=#fefefe
| 560901 ||  || — || October 28, 2005 || Kitt Peak || Spacewatch ||  || align=right data-sort-value="0.68" | 680 m || 
|-id=902 bgcolor=#fefefe
| 560902 ||  || — || April 11, 2008 || Kitt Peak || Spacewatch ||  || align=right data-sort-value="0.59" | 590 m || 
|-id=903 bgcolor=#fefefe
| 560903 ||  || — || October 26, 2002 || Haleakala || AMOS ||  || align=right data-sort-value="0.74" | 740 m || 
|-id=904 bgcolor=#fefefe
| 560904 ||  || — || August 31, 2005 || Palomar || NEAT ||  || align=right data-sort-value="0.83" | 830 m || 
|-id=905 bgcolor=#fefefe
| 560905 ||  || — || May 3, 2011 || Kitt Peak || Spacewatch ||  || align=right data-sort-value="0.62" | 620 m || 
|-id=906 bgcolor=#fefefe
| 560906 ||  || — || October 2, 2008 || Mount Lemmon || Mount Lemmon Survey ||  || align=right data-sort-value="0.91" | 910 m || 
|-id=907 bgcolor=#fefefe
| 560907 ||  || — || August 26, 2012 || Haleakala || Pan-STARRS ||  || align=right data-sort-value="0.52" | 520 m || 
|-id=908 bgcolor=#fefefe
| 560908 ||  || — || October 10, 2012 || Kitt Peak || Spacewatch ||  || align=right data-sort-value="0.69" | 690 m || 
|-id=909 bgcolor=#fefefe
| 560909 ||  || — || February 14, 2010 || Kitt Peak || Spacewatch ||  || align=right data-sort-value="0.77" | 770 m || 
|-id=910 bgcolor=#fefefe
| 560910 ||  || — || October 17, 2012 || Mount Lemmon || Mount Lemmon Survey ||  || align=right data-sort-value="0.61" | 610 m || 
|-id=911 bgcolor=#fefefe
| 560911 ||  || — || August 25, 2004 || Kitt Peak || Spacewatch ||  || align=right data-sort-value="0.60" | 600 m || 
|-id=912 bgcolor=#fefefe
| 560912 ||  || — || February 28, 2006 || Mount Lemmon || Mount Lemmon Survey ||  || align=right data-sort-value="0.73" | 730 m || 
|-id=913 bgcolor=#E9E9E9
| 560913 ||  || — || June 24, 2015 || Haleakala || Pan-STARRS ||  || align=right | 1.1 km || 
|-id=914 bgcolor=#E9E9E9
| 560914 ||  || — || June 14, 2015 || Mount Lemmon || Mount Lemmon Survey ||  || align=right | 1.7 km || 
|-id=915 bgcolor=#fefefe
| 560915 ||  || — || June 17, 2015 || Haleakala || Pan-STARRS ||  || align=right data-sort-value="0.74" | 740 m || 
|-id=916 bgcolor=#d6d6d6
| 560916 ||  || — || June 18, 2015 || Haleakala || Pan-STARRS ||  || align=right | 2.1 km || 
|-id=917 bgcolor=#fefefe
| 560917 ||  || — || June 19, 2015 || Haleakala || Pan-STARRS ||  || align=right data-sort-value="0.69" | 690 m || 
|-id=918 bgcolor=#d6d6d6
| 560918 ||  || — || June 27, 2015 || Haleakala || Pan-STARRS ||  || align=right | 2.1 km || 
|-id=919 bgcolor=#d6d6d6
| 560919 ||  || — || June 19, 2015 || Haleakala || Pan-STARRS ||  || align=right | 2.6 km || 
|-id=920 bgcolor=#E9E9E9
| 560920 ||  || — || June 22, 2015 || Haleakala || Pan-STARRS ||  || align=right data-sort-value="0.92" | 920 m || 
|-id=921 bgcolor=#E9E9E9
| 560921 ||  || — || June 26, 2015 || Haleakala || Pan-STARRS ||  || align=right data-sort-value="0.69" | 690 m || 
|-id=922 bgcolor=#d6d6d6
| 560922 ||  || — || June 16, 2015 || Haleakala || Pan-STARRS ||  || align=right | 2.8 km || 
|-id=923 bgcolor=#fefefe
| 560923 ||  || — || August 29, 2005 || Kitt Peak || Spacewatch ||  || align=right data-sort-value="0.54" | 540 m || 
|-id=924 bgcolor=#fefefe
| 560924 ||  || — || October 20, 2006 || Kitt Peak || Spacewatch ||  || align=right data-sort-value="0.50" | 500 m || 
|-id=925 bgcolor=#fefefe
| 560925 ||  || — || November 12, 2001 || Apache Point || SDSS Collaboration ||  || align=right data-sort-value="0.79" | 790 m || 
|-id=926 bgcolor=#fefefe
| 560926 ||  || — || September 18, 2009 || Kitt Peak || Spacewatch ||  || align=right data-sort-value="0.43" | 430 m || 
|-id=927 bgcolor=#fefefe
| 560927 ||  || — || October 11, 2012 || Kitt Peak || Spacewatch ||  || align=right data-sort-value="0.61" | 610 m || 
|-id=928 bgcolor=#d6d6d6
| 560928 ||  || — || February 8, 2008 || Kitt Peak || Spacewatch ||  || align=right | 2.8 km || 
|-id=929 bgcolor=#fefefe
| 560929 ||  || — || August 31, 2005 || Palomar || NEAT ||  || align=right data-sort-value="0.85" | 850 m || 
|-id=930 bgcolor=#fefefe
| 560930 ||  || — || August 4, 2002 || Palomar || NEAT ||  || align=right data-sort-value="0.63" | 630 m || 
|-id=931 bgcolor=#d6d6d6
| 560931 ||  || — || August 31, 2005 || Kitt Peak || Spacewatch ||  || align=right | 1.9 km || 
|-id=932 bgcolor=#d6d6d6
| 560932 ||  || — || October 5, 2016 || Mount Lemmon || Mount Lemmon Survey ||  || align=right | 2.7 km || 
|-id=933 bgcolor=#E9E9E9
| 560933 ||  || — || July 12, 2015 || Haleakala || Pan-STARRS ||  || align=right | 1.7 km || 
|-id=934 bgcolor=#fefefe
| 560934 ||  || — || August 31, 2005 || Kitt Peak || Spacewatch ||  || align=right data-sort-value="0.59" | 590 m || 
|-id=935 bgcolor=#fefefe
| 560935 ||  || — || November 7, 2012 || Haleakala || Pan-STARRS ||  || align=right data-sort-value="0.68" | 680 m || 
|-id=936 bgcolor=#fefefe
| 560936 ||  || — || February 26, 2014 || Mount Lemmon || Mount Lemmon Survey ||  || align=right data-sort-value="0.66" | 660 m || 
|-id=937 bgcolor=#fefefe
| 560937 ||  || — || November 27, 2009 || Mount Lemmon || Mount Lemmon Survey ||  || align=right data-sort-value="0.63" | 630 m || 
|-id=938 bgcolor=#fefefe
| 560938 ||  || — || December 27, 2006 || Mount Lemmon || Mount Lemmon Survey ||  || align=right data-sort-value="0.80" | 800 m || 
|-id=939 bgcolor=#fefefe
| 560939 ||  || — || July 29, 2005 || Palomar || NEAT ||  || align=right data-sort-value="0.97" | 970 m || 
|-id=940 bgcolor=#fefefe
| 560940 ||  || — || February 6, 2007 || Mount Lemmon || Mount Lemmon Survey ||  || align=right data-sort-value="0.68" | 680 m || 
|-id=941 bgcolor=#fefefe
| 560941 ||  || — || August 7, 2008 || Kitt Peak || Spacewatch ||  || align=right data-sort-value="0.71" | 710 m || 
|-id=942 bgcolor=#fefefe
| 560942 ||  || — || July 12, 2015 || Haleakala || Pan-STARRS ||  || align=right | 1.3 km || 
|-id=943 bgcolor=#d6d6d6
| 560943 ||  || — || July 18, 2015 || Haleakala || Pan-STARRS ||  || align=right | 2.5 km || 
|-id=944 bgcolor=#FA8072
| 560944 ||  || — || October 1, 2005 || Anderson Mesa || LONEOS ||  || align=right data-sort-value="0.82" | 820 m || 
|-id=945 bgcolor=#fefefe
| 560945 ||  || — || July 23, 2015 || Haleakala || Pan-STARRS ||  || align=right data-sort-value="0.66" | 660 m || 
|-id=946 bgcolor=#fefefe
| 560946 ||  || — || April 28, 2011 || Haleakala || Pan-STARRS ||  || align=right data-sort-value="0.72" | 720 m || 
|-id=947 bgcolor=#FA8072
| 560947 ||  || — || November 28, 2005 || Kitt Peak || Spacewatch ||  || align=right data-sort-value="0.91" | 910 m || 
|-id=948 bgcolor=#fefefe
| 560948 ||  || — || August 13, 2001 || Haleakala || AMOS ||  || align=right data-sort-value="0.93" | 930 m || 
|-id=949 bgcolor=#fefefe
| 560949 ||  || — || July 23, 2015 || Haleakala || Pan-STARRS ||  || align=right data-sort-value="0.98" | 980 m || 
|-id=950 bgcolor=#fefefe
| 560950 ||  || — || September 25, 2008 || Kitt Peak || Spacewatch ||  || align=right data-sort-value="0.66" | 660 m || 
|-id=951 bgcolor=#E9E9E9
| 560951 ||  || — || October 16, 2011 || Kitt Peak || Spacewatch ||  || align=right data-sort-value="0.85" | 850 m || 
|-id=952 bgcolor=#E9E9E9
| 560952 ||  || — || February 27, 2009 || Kitt Peak || Spacewatch ||  || align=right data-sort-value="0.86" | 860 m || 
|-id=953 bgcolor=#fefefe
| 560953 ||  || — || November 17, 2006 || Kitt Peak || Spacewatch ||  || align=right data-sort-value="0.64" | 640 m || 
|-id=954 bgcolor=#fefefe
| 560954 ||  || — || August 15, 2004 || Cerro Tololo || Cerro Tololo Obs. ||  || align=right data-sort-value="0.92" | 920 m || 
|-id=955 bgcolor=#fefefe
| 560955 ||  || — || April 26, 2011 || Mount Lemmon || Mount Lemmon Survey ||  || align=right data-sort-value="0.77" | 770 m || 
|-id=956 bgcolor=#fefefe
| 560956 ||  || — || November 25, 2009 || Kitt Peak || Spacewatch ||  || align=right data-sort-value="0.50" | 500 m || 
|-id=957 bgcolor=#fefefe
| 560957 ||  || — || February 20, 2014 || Haleakala || Pan-STARRS ||  || align=right | 1.0 km || 
|-id=958 bgcolor=#E9E9E9
| 560958 ||  || — || May 8, 2014 || Haleakala || Pan-STARRS ||  || align=right data-sort-value="0.80" | 800 m || 
|-id=959 bgcolor=#fefefe
| 560959 ||  || — || December 21, 2005 || Kitt Peak || Spacewatch ||  || align=right data-sort-value="0.72" | 720 m || 
|-id=960 bgcolor=#fefefe
| 560960 ||  || — || October 8, 2012 || Kitt Peak || Spacewatch ||  || align=right data-sort-value="0.63" | 630 m || 
|-id=961 bgcolor=#d6d6d6
| 560961 ||  || — || July 26, 2015 || Haleakala || Pan-STARRS || Tj (2.96) || align=right | 3.7 km || 
|-id=962 bgcolor=#fefefe
| 560962 ||  || — || July 26, 2015 || Haleakala || Pan-STARRS ||  || align=right data-sort-value="0.94" | 940 m || 
|-id=963 bgcolor=#fefefe
| 560963 ||  || — || August 29, 2005 || Kitt Peak || Spacewatch ||  || align=right data-sort-value="0.74" | 740 m || 
|-id=964 bgcolor=#fefefe
| 560964 ||  || — || October 15, 2012 || Kitt Peak || Spacewatch ||  || align=right data-sort-value="0.64" | 640 m || 
|-id=965 bgcolor=#fefefe
| 560965 ||  || — || March 15, 2008 || Kitt Peak || Spacewatch ||  || align=right data-sort-value="0.45" | 450 m || 
|-id=966 bgcolor=#E9E9E9
| 560966 ||  || — || October 19, 2011 || Kitt Peak || Spacewatch ||  || align=right | 1.1 km || 
|-id=967 bgcolor=#fefefe
| 560967 ||  || — || December 3, 2012 || Mount Lemmon || Mount Lemmon Survey ||  || align=right data-sort-value="0.77" | 770 m || 
|-id=968 bgcolor=#fefefe
| 560968 ||  || — || February 28, 2014 || Haleakala || Pan-STARRS ||  || align=right data-sort-value="0.74" | 740 m || 
|-id=969 bgcolor=#fefefe
| 560969 ||  || — || August 6, 2008 || La Sagra || OAM Obs. ||  || align=right data-sort-value="0.70" | 700 m || 
|-id=970 bgcolor=#fefefe
| 560970 ||  || — || September 22, 2008 || Mount Lemmon || Mount Lemmon Survey ||  || align=right data-sort-value="0.77" | 770 m || 
|-id=971 bgcolor=#fefefe
| 560971 ||  || — || October 25, 2008 || Kitt Peak || Spacewatch ||  || align=right data-sort-value="0.67" | 670 m || 
|-id=972 bgcolor=#fefefe
| 560972 ||  || — || July 28, 2011 || Haleakala || Pan-STARRS ||  || align=right data-sort-value="0.97" | 970 m || 
|-id=973 bgcolor=#fefefe
| 560973 ||  || — || January 16, 2005 || Mauna Kea || Mauna Kea Obs. ||  || align=right data-sort-value="0.68" | 680 m || 
|-id=974 bgcolor=#fefefe
| 560974 ||  || — || July 23, 2015 || Haleakala || Pan-STARRS ||  || align=right data-sort-value="0.65" | 650 m || 
|-id=975 bgcolor=#fefefe
| 560975 ||  || — || September 22, 2008 || Mount Lemmon || Mount Lemmon Survey ||  || align=right data-sort-value="0.64" | 640 m || 
|-id=976 bgcolor=#fefefe
| 560976 ||  || — || April 10, 2010 || Mount Lemmon || Mount Lemmon Survey ||  || align=right data-sort-value="0.91" | 910 m || 
|-id=977 bgcolor=#fefefe
| 560977 ||  || — || November 17, 2012 || Mount Lemmon || Mount Lemmon Survey ||  || align=right data-sort-value="0.64" | 640 m || 
|-id=978 bgcolor=#E9E9E9
| 560978 ||  || — || November 19, 2007 || Mount Lemmon || Mount Lemmon Survey ||  || align=right | 1.4 km || 
|-id=979 bgcolor=#d6d6d6
| 560979 ||  || — || July 19, 2015 || Haleakala || Pan-STARRS ||  || align=right | 2.2 km || 
|-id=980 bgcolor=#fefefe
| 560980 ||  || — || March 31, 2003 || Kitt Peak || Spacewatch ||  || align=right data-sort-value="0.85" | 850 m || 
|-id=981 bgcolor=#fefefe
| 560981 ||  || — || October 23, 2008 || Mount Lemmon || Mount Lemmon Survey ||  || align=right data-sort-value="0.65" | 650 m || 
|-id=982 bgcolor=#fefefe
| 560982 ||  || — || September 22, 2008 || Kitt Peak || Spacewatch ||  || align=right data-sort-value="0.67" | 670 m || 
|-id=983 bgcolor=#fefefe
| 560983 ||  || — || February 9, 2014 || Haleakala || Pan-STARRS ||  || align=right data-sort-value="0.64" | 640 m || 
|-id=984 bgcolor=#fefefe
| 560984 ||  || — || February 8, 2002 || Kitt Peak || R. Millis, M. W. Buie ||  || align=right data-sort-value="0.77" | 770 m || 
|-id=985 bgcolor=#E9E9E9
| 560985 ||  || — || October 25, 2011 || Haleakala || Pan-STARRS ||  || align=right | 1.4 km || 
|-id=986 bgcolor=#d6d6d6
| 560986 ||  || — || March 15, 2013 || Kitt Peak || Spacewatch ||  || align=right | 2.3 km || 
|-id=987 bgcolor=#fefefe
| 560987 ||  || — || April 8, 2010 || Kitt Peak || Spacewatch ||  || align=right data-sort-value="0.99" | 990 m || 
|-id=988 bgcolor=#fefefe
| 560988 ||  || — || July 28, 2015 || Haleakala || Pan-STARRS ||  || align=right data-sort-value="0.56" | 560 m || 
|-id=989 bgcolor=#fefefe
| 560989 ||  || — || April 1, 2014 || Kitt Peak || Spacewatch ||  || align=right data-sort-value="0.58" | 580 m || 
|-id=990 bgcolor=#E9E9E9
| 560990 ||  || — || July 27, 2015 || Haleakala || Pan-STARRS ||  || align=right data-sort-value="0.95" | 950 m || 
|-id=991 bgcolor=#fefefe
| 560991 ||  || — || October 28, 2005 || Mount Lemmon || Mount Lemmon Survey ||  || align=right data-sort-value="0.57" | 570 m || 
|-id=992 bgcolor=#fefefe
| 560992 ||  || — || July 24, 2015 || Haleakala || Pan-STARRS ||  || align=right data-sort-value="0.63" | 630 m || 
|-id=993 bgcolor=#E9E9E9
| 560993 ||  || — || July 24, 2015 || Haleakala || Pan-STARRS ||  || align=right | 1.4 km || 
|-id=994 bgcolor=#fefefe
| 560994 ||  || — || May 7, 2014 || Haleakala || Pan-STARRS ||  || align=right data-sort-value="0.60" | 600 m || 
|-id=995 bgcolor=#E9E9E9
| 560995 ||  || — || July 25, 2015 || Haleakala || Pan-STARRS ||  || align=right data-sort-value="0.93" | 930 m || 
|-id=996 bgcolor=#E9E9E9
| 560996 ||  || — || July 25, 2015 || Haleakala || Pan-STARRS ||  || align=right | 1.6 km || 
|-id=997 bgcolor=#FA8072
| 560997 ||  || — || November 1, 2011 || Siding Spring || SSS ||  || align=right | 1.4 km || 
|-id=998 bgcolor=#E9E9E9
| 560998 ||  || — || April 2, 2009 || Mount Lemmon || Mount Lemmon Survey ||  || align=right | 1.8 km || 
|-id=999 bgcolor=#fefefe
| 560999 ||  || — || October 19, 2012 || Mount Lemmon || Mount Lemmon Survey ||  || align=right data-sort-value="0.76" | 760 m || 
|-id=000 bgcolor=#fefefe
| 561000 ||  || — || March 28, 2014 || Mount Lemmon || Mount Lemmon Survey ||  || align=right data-sort-value="0.86" | 860 m || 
|}

References

External links 
 Discovery Circumstances: Numbered Minor Planets (560001)–(565000) (IAU Minor Planet Center)

0560